

394001–394100 

|-bgcolor=#d6d6d6
| 394001 ||  || — || October 25, 2005 || Apache Point || A. C. Becker || — || align=right | 2.0 km || 
|-id=002 bgcolor=#d6d6d6
| 394002 ||  || — || October 27, 2005 || Apache Point || A. C. Becker || — || align=right | 1.9 km || 
|-id=003 bgcolor=#d6d6d6
| 394003 ||  || — || September 14, 2005 || Kitt Peak || Spacewatch || — || align=right | 2.8 km || 
|-id=004 bgcolor=#d6d6d6
| 394004 ||  || — || October 25, 2005 || Kitt Peak || Spacewatch || — || align=right | 3.9 km || 
|-id=005 bgcolor=#fefefe
| 394005 ||  || — || October 26, 2005 || Kitt Peak || Spacewatch || — || align=right data-sort-value="0.82" | 820 m || 
|-id=006 bgcolor=#d6d6d6
| 394006 ||  || — || November 6, 2005 || Mayhill || A. Lowe || — || align=right | 3.9 km || 
|-id=007 bgcolor=#d6d6d6
| 394007 ||  || — || October 10, 2005 || Catalina || CSS || — || align=right | 3.8 km || 
|-id=008 bgcolor=#d6d6d6
| 394008 ||  || — || November 1, 2005 || Catalina || CSS || — || align=right | 3.4 km || 
|-id=009 bgcolor=#d6d6d6
| 394009 ||  || — || October 29, 2005 || Kitt Peak || Spacewatch || — || align=right | 3.9 km || 
|-id=010 bgcolor=#d6d6d6
| 394010 ||  || — || October 22, 2005 || Kitt Peak || Spacewatch || — || align=right | 2.3 km || 
|-id=011 bgcolor=#d6d6d6
| 394011 ||  || — || October 28, 2005 || Mount Lemmon || Mount Lemmon Survey || — || align=right | 4.1 km || 
|-id=012 bgcolor=#d6d6d6
| 394012 ||  || — || November 5, 2005 || Socorro || LINEAR || — || align=right | 3.9 km || 
|-id=013 bgcolor=#FA8072
| 394013 ||  || — || November 5, 2005 || Anderson Mesa || LONEOS || — || align=right data-sort-value="0.73" | 730 m || 
|-id=014 bgcolor=#d6d6d6
| 394014 ||  || — || November 1, 2005 || Mount Lemmon || Mount Lemmon Survey || — || align=right | 3.0 km || 
|-id=015 bgcolor=#fefefe
| 394015 ||  || — || November 3, 2005 || Socorro || LINEAR || — || align=right data-sort-value="0.75" | 750 m || 
|-id=016 bgcolor=#fefefe
| 394016 ||  || — || October 22, 2005 || Catalina || CSS || — || align=right data-sort-value="0.90" | 900 m || 
|-id=017 bgcolor=#d6d6d6
| 394017 ||  || — || November 2, 2005 || Mount Lemmon || Mount Lemmon Survey || EUP || align=right | 6.0 km || 
|-id=018 bgcolor=#fefefe
| 394018 ||  || — || November 2, 2005 || Mount Lemmon || Mount Lemmon Survey || — || align=right data-sort-value="0.70" | 700 m || 
|-id=019 bgcolor=#d6d6d6
| 394019 ||  || — || November 6, 2005 || Kitt Peak || Spacewatch || — || align=right | 3.4 km || 
|-id=020 bgcolor=#d6d6d6
| 394020 ||  || — || November 4, 2005 || Kitt Peak || Spacewatch || — || align=right | 3.3 km || 
|-id=021 bgcolor=#d6d6d6
| 394021 ||  || — || November 1, 2005 || Apache Point || A. C. Becker || — || align=right | 2.2 km || 
|-id=022 bgcolor=#d6d6d6
| 394022 ||  || — || November 1, 2005 || Apache Point || A. C. Becker || — || align=right | 2.3 km || 
|-id=023 bgcolor=#fefefe
| 394023 ||  || — || November 21, 2005 || Kitt Peak || Spacewatch || — || align=right data-sort-value="0.75" | 750 m || 
|-id=024 bgcolor=#d6d6d6
| 394024 ||  || — || November 22, 2005 || Kitt Peak || Spacewatch || — || align=right | 2.8 km || 
|-id=025 bgcolor=#d6d6d6
| 394025 ||  || — || November 3, 2005 || Kitt Peak || Spacewatch || — || align=right | 3.9 km || 
|-id=026 bgcolor=#d6d6d6
| 394026 ||  || — || November 22, 2005 || Kitt Peak || Spacewatch || — || align=right | 2.9 km || 
|-id=027 bgcolor=#d6d6d6
| 394027 ||  || — || November 22, 2005 || Kitt Peak || Spacewatch || — || align=right | 3.9 km || 
|-id=028 bgcolor=#fefefe
| 394028 ||  || — || November 21, 2005 || Kitt Peak || Spacewatch || — || align=right data-sort-value="0.80" | 800 m || 
|-id=029 bgcolor=#fefefe
| 394029 ||  || — || November 3, 2005 || Kitt Peak || Spacewatch || — || align=right data-sort-value="0.98" | 980 m || 
|-id=030 bgcolor=#fefefe
| 394030 ||  || — || November 21, 2005 || Kitt Peak || Spacewatch || MAS || align=right data-sort-value="0.73" | 730 m || 
|-id=031 bgcolor=#fefefe
| 394031 ||  || — || November 21, 2005 || Kitt Peak || Spacewatch || MAS || align=right data-sort-value="0.72" | 720 m || 
|-id=032 bgcolor=#fefefe
| 394032 ||  || — || November 25, 2005 || Mount Lemmon || Mount Lemmon Survey || — || align=right data-sort-value="0.86" | 860 m || 
|-id=033 bgcolor=#d6d6d6
| 394033 ||  || — || November 25, 2005 || Mount Lemmon || Mount Lemmon Survey || — || align=right | 2.9 km || 
|-id=034 bgcolor=#d6d6d6
| 394034 ||  || — || November 25, 2005 || Palomar || NEAT || — || align=right | 2.8 km || 
|-id=035 bgcolor=#d6d6d6
| 394035 ||  || — || October 27, 2005 || Catalina || CSS || (1118) || align=right | 4.8 km || 
|-id=036 bgcolor=#fefefe
| 394036 ||  || — || November 25, 2005 || Mount Lemmon || Mount Lemmon Survey || — || align=right data-sort-value="0.78" | 780 m || 
|-id=037 bgcolor=#d6d6d6
| 394037 ||  || — || November 25, 2005 || Kitt Peak || Spacewatch || URS || align=right | 5.1 km || 
|-id=038 bgcolor=#d6d6d6
| 394038 ||  || — || November 28, 2005 || Mount Lemmon || Mount Lemmon Survey || — || align=right | 3.0 km || 
|-id=039 bgcolor=#d6d6d6
| 394039 ||  || — || November 28, 2005 || Mount Lemmon || Mount Lemmon Survey || — || align=right | 3.7 km || 
|-id=040 bgcolor=#d6d6d6
| 394040 ||  || — || November 1, 2005 || Mount Lemmon || Mount Lemmon Survey || — || align=right | 4.2 km || 
|-id=041 bgcolor=#fefefe
| 394041 ||  || — || November 29, 2005 || Socorro || LINEAR || ERI || align=right | 2.1 km || 
|-id=042 bgcolor=#fefefe
| 394042 ||  || — || November 25, 2005 || Catalina || CSS || — || align=right data-sort-value="0.85" | 850 m || 
|-id=043 bgcolor=#d6d6d6
| 394043 ||  || — || June 20, 2004 || Kitt Peak || Spacewatch || — || align=right | 4.8 km || 
|-id=044 bgcolor=#d6d6d6
| 394044 ||  || — || November 28, 2005 || Socorro || LINEAR || — || align=right | 5.3 km || 
|-id=045 bgcolor=#d6d6d6
| 394045 ||  || — || November 25, 2005 || Kitt Peak || Spacewatch || — || align=right | 5.5 km || 
|-id=046 bgcolor=#d6d6d6
| 394046 ||  || — || November 29, 2005 || Anderson Mesa || LONEOS || — || align=right | 5.1 km || 
|-id=047 bgcolor=#d6d6d6
| 394047 ||  || — || November 28, 2005 || Mount Lemmon || Mount Lemmon Survey || EOS || align=right | 2.0 km || 
|-id=048 bgcolor=#fefefe
| 394048 ||  || — || November 25, 2005 || Kitt Peak || Spacewatch || — || align=right data-sort-value="0.75" | 750 m || 
|-id=049 bgcolor=#fefefe
| 394049 ||  || — || November 26, 2005 || Kitt Peak || Spacewatch || — || align=right | 1.00 km || 
|-id=050 bgcolor=#fefefe
| 394050 ||  || — || November 21, 2005 || Kitt Peak || Spacewatch || — || align=right data-sort-value="0.75" | 750 m || 
|-id=051 bgcolor=#fefefe
| 394051 ||  || — || November 29, 2005 || Kitt Peak || Spacewatch || — || align=right data-sort-value="0.59" | 590 m || 
|-id=052 bgcolor=#d6d6d6
| 394052 ||  || — || November 29, 2005 || Kitt Peak || Spacewatch || — || align=right | 3.3 km || 
|-id=053 bgcolor=#fefefe
| 394053 ||  || — || November 29, 2005 || Kitt Peak || Spacewatch || — || align=right data-sort-value="0.88" | 880 m || 
|-id=054 bgcolor=#fefefe
| 394054 ||  || — || November 30, 2005 || Kitt Peak || Spacewatch || — || align=right data-sort-value="0.62" | 620 m || 
|-id=055 bgcolor=#fefefe
| 394055 ||  || — || November 25, 2005 || Catalina || CSS || — || align=right | 1.0 km || 
|-id=056 bgcolor=#d6d6d6
| 394056 ||  || — || November 26, 2005 || Kitt Peak || Spacewatch || — || align=right | 2.6 km || 
|-id=057 bgcolor=#fefefe
| 394057 ||  || — || November 30, 2005 || Kitt Peak || Spacewatch || (2076) || align=right | 1.1 km || 
|-id=058 bgcolor=#d6d6d6
| 394058 || 2005 XF || — || December 1, 2005 || Junk Bond || D. Healy || — || align=right | 2.7 km || 
|-id=059 bgcolor=#fefefe
| 394059 ||  || — || December 6, 2005 || Cordell-Lorenz || Cordell–Lorenz Obs. || — || align=right data-sort-value="0.94" | 940 m || 
|-id=060 bgcolor=#d6d6d6
| 394060 ||  || — || December 4, 2005 || Mount Lemmon || Mount Lemmon Survey || — || align=right | 5.6 km || 
|-id=061 bgcolor=#fefefe
| 394061 ||  || — || December 1, 2005 || Catalina || CSS || — || align=right data-sort-value="0.77" | 770 m || 
|-id=062 bgcolor=#d6d6d6
| 394062 ||  || — || December 2, 2005 || Kitt Peak || Spacewatch || — || align=right | 2.9 km || 
|-id=063 bgcolor=#fefefe
| 394063 ||  || — || November 25, 2005 || Kitt Peak || Spacewatch || — || align=right data-sort-value="0.81" | 810 m || 
|-id=064 bgcolor=#d6d6d6
| 394064 ||  || — || December 5, 2005 || Kitt Peak || Spacewatch || — || align=right | 2.6 km || 
|-id=065 bgcolor=#d6d6d6
| 394065 ||  || — || December 4, 2005 || Kitt Peak || Spacewatch || 7:4 || align=right | 3.2 km || 
|-id=066 bgcolor=#FA8072
| 394066 ||  || — || December 10, 2005 || Socorro || LINEAR || Tj (2.95) || align=right | 4.7 km || 
|-id=067 bgcolor=#fefefe
| 394067 ||  || — || December 24, 2005 || Kitt Peak || Spacewatch || — || align=right data-sort-value="0.70" | 700 m || 
|-id=068 bgcolor=#fefefe
| 394068 ||  || — || December 25, 2005 || Mount Lemmon || Mount Lemmon Survey || — || align=right data-sort-value="0.82" | 820 m || 
|-id=069 bgcolor=#fefefe
| 394069 ||  || — || December 28, 2005 || Mount Lemmon || Mount Lemmon Survey || — || align=right data-sort-value="0.71" | 710 m || 
|-id=070 bgcolor=#fefefe
| 394070 ||  || — || December 29, 2005 || Mount Lemmon || Mount Lemmon Survey || — || align=right data-sort-value="0.94" | 940 m || 
|-id=071 bgcolor=#fefefe
| 394071 ||  || — || December 28, 2005 || Mount Lemmon || Mount Lemmon Survey || — || align=right | 1.5 km || 
|-id=072 bgcolor=#d6d6d6
| 394072 ||  || — || December 27, 2005 || Kitt Peak || Spacewatch || — || align=right | 3.0 km || 
|-id=073 bgcolor=#fefefe
| 394073 ||  || — || December 29, 2005 || Kitt Peak || Spacewatch || NYS || align=right data-sort-value="0.52" | 520 m || 
|-id=074 bgcolor=#fefefe
| 394074 ||  || — || December 22, 2005 || Kitt Peak || Spacewatch || — || align=right | 1.6 km || 
|-id=075 bgcolor=#fefefe
| 394075 ||  || — || December 28, 2005 || Kitt Peak || Spacewatch || — || align=right | 2.1 km || 
|-id=076 bgcolor=#fefefe
| 394076 ||  || — || December 22, 2005 || Kitt Peak || Spacewatch || — || align=right data-sort-value="0.81" | 810 m || 
|-id=077 bgcolor=#fefefe
| 394077 ||  || — || December 25, 2005 || Kitt Peak || Spacewatch || MAS || align=right data-sort-value="0.58" | 580 m || 
|-id=078 bgcolor=#fefefe
| 394078 ||  || — || December 7, 2005 || Kitt Peak || Spacewatch || MAS || align=right data-sort-value="0.59" | 590 m || 
|-id=079 bgcolor=#fefefe
| 394079 ||  || — || December 28, 2005 || Mount Lemmon || Mount Lemmon Survey || — || align=right data-sort-value="0.86" | 860 m || 
|-id=080 bgcolor=#fefefe
| 394080 ||  || — || December 25, 2005 || Kitt Peak || Spacewatch || — || align=right | 1.0 km || 
|-id=081 bgcolor=#d6d6d6
| 394081 ||  || — || January 4, 2006 || Kitt Peak || Spacewatch || — || align=right | 3.6 km || 
|-id=082 bgcolor=#fefefe
| 394082 ||  || — || January 4, 2006 || Mount Lemmon || Mount Lemmon Survey || — || align=right data-sort-value="0.67" | 670 m || 
|-id=083 bgcolor=#fefefe
| 394083 ||  || — || January 7, 2006 || Kitt Peak || Spacewatch || — || align=right | 1.6 km || 
|-id=084 bgcolor=#FA8072
| 394084 ||  || — || January 21, 2006 || Anderson Mesa || LONEOS || H || align=right data-sort-value="0.94" | 940 m || 
|-id=085 bgcolor=#fefefe
| 394085 ||  || — || January 20, 2006 || Kitt Peak || Spacewatch || NYS || align=right data-sort-value="0.71" | 710 m || 
|-id=086 bgcolor=#fefefe
| 394086 ||  || — || January 21, 2006 || Kitt Peak || Spacewatch || — || align=right data-sort-value="0.96" | 960 m || 
|-id=087 bgcolor=#fefefe
| 394087 ||  || — || January 22, 2006 || Mount Lemmon || Mount Lemmon Survey || — || align=right data-sort-value="0.70" | 700 m || 
|-id=088 bgcolor=#fefefe
| 394088 ||  || — || January 22, 2006 || Mount Lemmon || Mount Lemmon Survey || — || align=right data-sort-value="0.87" | 870 m || 
|-id=089 bgcolor=#d6d6d6
| 394089 ||  || — || December 28, 2005 || Mount Lemmon || Mount Lemmon Survey || 7:4 || align=right | 3.8 km || 
|-id=090 bgcolor=#fefefe
| 394090 ||  || — || January 22, 2006 || Mount Lemmon || Mount Lemmon Survey || V || align=right data-sort-value="0.89" | 890 m || 
|-id=091 bgcolor=#fefefe
| 394091 ||  || — || January 23, 2006 || Mount Lemmon || Mount Lemmon Survey || — || align=right data-sort-value="0.77" | 770 m || 
|-id=092 bgcolor=#fefefe
| 394092 ||  || — || January 23, 2006 || Mount Lemmon || Mount Lemmon Survey || — || align=right | 1.0 km || 
|-id=093 bgcolor=#fefefe
| 394093 ||  || — || January 25, 2006 || Kitt Peak || Spacewatch || MAS || align=right data-sort-value="0.65" | 650 m || 
|-id=094 bgcolor=#fefefe
| 394094 ||  || — || January 22, 2006 || Catalina || CSS || — || align=right data-sort-value="0.81" | 810 m || 
|-id=095 bgcolor=#fefefe
| 394095 ||  || — || January 23, 2006 || Kitt Peak || Spacewatch || — || align=right | 1.5 km || 
|-id=096 bgcolor=#fefefe
| 394096 ||  || — || January 23, 2006 || Kitt Peak || Spacewatch || — || align=right | 1.0 km || 
|-id=097 bgcolor=#fefefe
| 394097 ||  || — || January 23, 2006 || Kitt Peak || Spacewatch || NYS || align=right data-sort-value="0.56" | 560 m || 
|-id=098 bgcolor=#fefefe
| 394098 ||  || — || January 25, 2006 || Kitt Peak || Spacewatch || — || align=right data-sort-value="0.93" | 930 m || 
|-id=099 bgcolor=#fefefe
| 394099 ||  || — || January 25, 2006 || Kitt Peak || Spacewatch || — || align=right data-sort-value="0.78" | 780 m || 
|-id=100 bgcolor=#fefefe
| 394100 ||  || — || January 25, 2006 || Kitt Peak || Spacewatch || — || align=right data-sort-value="0.77" | 770 m || 
|}

394101–394200 

|-bgcolor=#fefefe
| 394101 ||  || — || January 25, 2006 || Kitt Peak || Spacewatch || — || align=right data-sort-value="0.80" | 800 m || 
|-id=102 bgcolor=#fefefe
| 394102 ||  || — || December 1, 2005 || Kitt Peak || Spacewatch || — || align=right data-sort-value="0.93" | 930 m || 
|-id=103 bgcolor=#fefefe
| 394103 ||  || — || January 28, 2006 || Mount Lemmon || Mount Lemmon Survey || NYS || align=right data-sort-value="0.56" | 560 m || 
|-id=104 bgcolor=#fefefe
| 394104 ||  || — || January 26, 2006 || Anderson Mesa || LONEOS || H || align=right data-sort-value="0.87" | 870 m || 
|-id=105 bgcolor=#fefefe
| 394105 ||  || — || January 27, 2006 || Mount Lemmon || Mount Lemmon Survey || — || align=right data-sort-value="0.65" | 650 m || 
|-id=106 bgcolor=#fefefe
| 394106 ||  || — || January 28, 2006 || Mount Lemmon || Mount Lemmon Survey || NYScritical || align=right data-sort-value="0.48" | 480 m || 
|-id=107 bgcolor=#fefefe
| 394107 ||  || — || January 30, 2006 || Kitt Peak || Spacewatch || — || align=right data-sort-value="0.69" | 690 m || 
|-id=108 bgcolor=#fefefe
| 394108 ||  || — || February 1, 2006 || Mount Lemmon || Mount Lemmon Survey || NYS || align=right data-sort-value="0.66" | 660 m || 
|-id=109 bgcolor=#fefefe
| 394109 ||  || — || February 1, 2006 || Mount Lemmon || Mount Lemmon Survey || — || align=right data-sort-value="0.90" | 900 m || 
|-id=110 bgcolor=#fefefe
| 394110 ||  || — || February 2, 2006 || Kitt Peak || Spacewatch || — || align=right data-sort-value="0.85" | 850 m || 
|-id=111 bgcolor=#fefefe
| 394111 ||  || — || February 4, 2006 || Catalina || CSS || H || align=right data-sort-value="0.96" | 960 m || 
|-id=112 bgcolor=#fefefe
| 394112 ||  || — || February 20, 2006 || Catalina || CSS || H || align=right data-sort-value="0.90" | 900 m || 
|-id=113 bgcolor=#fefefe
| 394113 ||  || — || October 9, 2004 || Kitt Peak || Spacewatch || — || align=right data-sort-value="0.98" | 980 m || 
|-id=114 bgcolor=#fefefe
| 394114 ||  || — || January 23, 2006 || Kitt Peak || Spacewatch || NYS || align=right data-sort-value="0.54" | 540 m || 
|-id=115 bgcolor=#fefefe
| 394115 ||  || — || February 20, 2006 || Kitt Peak || Spacewatch || — || align=right data-sort-value="0.60" | 600 m || 
|-id=116 bgcolor=#E9E9E9
| 394116 ||  || — || February 27, 2006 || Kitt Peak || Spacewatch || — || align=right | 1.2 km || 
|-id=117 bgcolor=#fefefe
| 394117 ||  || — || February 27, 2006 || Kitt Peak || Spacewatch || — || align=right data-sort-value="0.87" | 870 m || 
|-id=118 bgcolor=#fefefe
| 394118 ||  || — || September 9, 1999 || Socorro || LINEAR || H || align=right data-sort-value="0.83" | 830 m || 
|-id=119 bgcolor=#d6d6d6
| 394119 ||  || — || March 2, 2006 || Kitt Peak || Spacewatch || 3:2 || align=right | 5.0 km || 
|-id=120 bgcolor=#fefefe
| 394120 ||  || — || March 3, 2006 || Kitt Peak || Spacewatch || NYS || align=right data-sort-value="0.46" | 460 m || 
|-id=121 bgcolor=#fefefe
| 394121 ||  || — || March 4, 2006 || Kitt Peak || Spacewatch || — || align=right data-sort-value="0.98" | 980 m || 
|-id=122 bgcolor=#fefefe
| 394122 ||  || — || March 23, 2006 || Kitt Peak || Spacewatch || — || align=right data-sort-value="0.73" | 730 m || 
|-id=123 bgcolor=#E9E9E9
| 394123 ||  || — || March 23, 2006 || Mount Lemmon || Mount Lemmon Survey || critical || align=right data-sort-value="0.78" | 780 m || 
|-id=124 bgcolor=#E9E9E9
| 394124 ||  || — || March 24, 2006 || Mount Lemmon || Mount Lemmon Survey || — || align=right data-sort-value="0.99" | 990 m || 
|-id=125 bgcolor=#d6d6d6
| 394125 ||  || — || March 25, 2006 || Kitt Peak || Spacewatch || SHU3:2 || align=right | 5.9 km || 
|-id=126 bgcolor=#fefefe
| 394126 ||  || — || April 7, 2006 || Anderson Mesa || LONEOS || H || align=right data-sort-value="0.81" | 810 m || 
|-id=127 bgcolor=#fefefe
| 394127 ||  || — || April 9, 2006 || Kitt Peak || Spacewatch || V || align=right data-sort-value="0.73" | 730 m || 
|-id=128 bgcolor=#E9E9E9
| 394128 ||  || — || April 19, 2006 || Mount Lemmon || Mount Lemmon Survey || — || align=right | 1.3 km || 
|-id=129 bgcolor=#E9E9E9
| 394129 ||  || — || April 24, 2006 || Kitt Peak || Spacewatch || — || align=right | 2.5 km || 
|-id=130 bgcolor=#FFC2E0
| 394130 ||  || — || April 26, 2006 || Socorro || LINEAR || APO +1km || align=right | 1.2 km || 
|-id=131 bgcolor=#d6d6d6
| 394131 ||  || — || April 8, 2006 || Kitt Peak || Spacewatch || SHU3:2 || align=right | 5.8 km || 
|-id=132 bgcolor=#E9E9E9
| 394132 ||  || — || April 25, 2006 || Kitt Peak || Spacewatch || — || align=right data-sort-value="0.81" | 810 m || 
|-id=133 bgcolor=#fefefe
| 394133 ||  || — || April 19, 2006 || Kitt Peak || Spacewatch || H || align=right data-sort-value="0.72" | 720 m || 
|-id=134 bgcolor=#E9E9E9
| 394134 ||  || — || May 1, 2006 || Socorro || LINEAR || — || align=right | 1.0 km || 
|-id=135 bgcolor=#E9E9E9
| 394135 ||  || — || May 4, 2006 || Kitt Peak || Spacewatch || — || align=right | 1.1 km || 
|-id=136 bgcolor=#E9E9E9
| 394136 ||  || — || May 4, 2006 || Kitt Peak || Spacewatch || (5) || align=right data-sort-value="0.81" | 810 m || 
|-id=137 bgcolor=#E9E9E9
| 394137 ||  || — || May 7, 2006 || Kitt Peak || Spacewatch || — || align=right | 2.0 km || 
|-id=138 bgcolor=#E9E9E9
| 394138 ||  || — || May 21, 2006 || Palomar || NEAT || — || align=right | 1.3 km || 
|-id=139 bgcolor=#E9E9E9
| 394139 ||  || — || May 20, 2006 || Kitt Peak || Spacewatch || — || align=right data-sort-value="0.94" | 940 m || 
|-id=140 bgcolor=#E9E9E9
| 394140 ||  || — || May 20, 2006 || Kitt Peak || Spacewatch || (5) || align=right data-sort-value="0.68" | 680 m || 
|-id=141 bgcolor=#FA8072
| 394141 ||  || — || May 24, 2006 || Siding Spring || SSS || — || align=right | 1.4 km || 
|-id=142 bgcolor=#E9E9E9
| 394142 ||  || — || May 21, 2006 || Kitt Peak || Spacewatch || EUN || align=right | 1.1 km || 
|-id=143 bgcolor=#E9E9E9
| 394143 ||  || — || May 22, 2006 || Kitt Peak || Spacewatch || — || align=right data-sort-value="0.92" | 920 m || 
|-id=144 bgcolor=#E9E9E9
| 394144 ||  || — || May 23, 2006 || Kitt Peak || Spacewatch || — || align=right | 1.0 km || 
|-id=145 bgcolor=#E9E9E9
| 394145 ||  || — || May 9, 2006 || Mount Lemmon || Mount Lemmon Survey || — || align=right data-sort-value="0.94" | 940 m || 
|-id=146 bgcolor=#fefefe
| 394146 ||  || — || May 2, 2006 || Catalina || CSS || H || align=right data-sort-value="0.94" | 940 m || 
|-id=147 bgcolor=#E9E9E9
| 394147 ||  || — || May 25, 2006 || Kitt Peak || Spacewatch || — || align=right data-sort-value="0.78" | 780 m || 
|-id=148 bgcolor=#E9E9E9
| 394148 ||  || — || May 28, 2006 || Kitt Peak || Spacewatch || — || align=right | 1.3 km || 
|-id=149 bgcolor=#E9E9E9
| 394149 ||  || — || May 6, 2006 || Mount Lemmon || Mount Lemmon Survey || — || align=right data-sort-value="0.84" | 840 m || 
|-id=150 bgcolor=#E9E9E9
| 394150 ||  || — || May 29, 2006 || Kitt Peak || Spacewatch || — || align=right data-sort-value="0.82" | 820 m || 
|-id=151 bgcolor=#E9E9E9
| 394151 ||  || — || June 1, 2006 || Kitt Peak || Spacewatch || — || align=right data-sort-value="0.86" | 860 m || 
|-id=152 bgcolor=#E9E9E9
| 394152 ||  || — || July 28, 2006 || Siding Spring || SSS || — || align=right | 2.9 km || 
|-id=153 bgcolor=#E9E9E9
| 394153 ||  || — || August 15, 2006 || Palomar || NEAT || — || align=right | 1.9 km || 
|-id=154 bgcolor=#E9E9E9
| 394154 ||  || — || July 18, 2006 || Siding Spring || SSS || — || align=right | 1.8 km || 
|-id=155 bgcolor=#FFC2E0
| 394155 ||  || — || August 18, 2006 || Socorro || LINEAR || AMOcritical || align=right data-sort-value="0.36" | 360 m || 
|-id=156 bgcolor=#E9E9E9
| 394156 ||  || — || August 17, 2006 || Palomar || NEAT || — || align=right | 1.0 km || 
|-id=157 bgcolor=#E9E9E9
| 394157 ||  || — || August 17, 2006 || Palomar || NEAT || — || align=right | 1.2 km || 
|-id=158 bgcolor=#E9E9E9
| 394158 ||  || — || August 18, 2006 || Anderson Mesa || LONEOS || JUN || align=right | 1.3 km || 
|-id=159 bgcolor=#E9E9E9
| 394159 ||  || — || August 18, 2006 || Socorro || LINEAR || — || align=right | 2.9 km || 
|-id=160 bgcolor=#E9E9E9
| 394160 ||  || — || August 17, 2006 || Palomar || NEAT || — || align=right | 2.8 km || 
|-id=161 bgcolor=#E9E9E9
| 394161 ||  || — || August 23, 2006 || Socorro || LINEAR || — || align=right | 2.4 km || 
|-id=162 bgcolor=#E9E9E9
| 394162 ||  || — || August 25, 2006 || Socorro || LINEAR || — || align=right | 3.0 km || 
|-id=163 bgcolor=#E9E9E9
| 394163 ||  || — || August 21, 2006 || Kitt Peak || Spacewatch || — || align=right | 2.0 km || 
|-id=164 bgcolor=#E9E9E9
| 394164 ||  || — || August 27, 2006 || Kitt Peak || Spacewatch || AEO || align=right | 1.2 km || 
|-id=165 bgcolor=#E9E9E9
| 394165 ||  || — || December 1, 1994 || Kitt Peak || Spacewatch || — || align=right | 1.6 km || 
|-id=166 bgcolor=#E9E9E9
| 394166 ||  || — || August 16, 2006 || Palomar || NEAT || — || align=right | 1.8 km || 
|-id=167 bgcolor=#E9E9E9
| 394167 ||  || — || August 16, 2006 || Palomar || NEAT || — || align=right | 1.9 km || 
|-id=168 bgcolor=#E9E9E9
| 394168 ||  || — || August 16, 2006 || Palomar || NEAT || — || align=right | 1.9 km || 
|-id=169 bgcolor=#E9E9E9
| 394169 ||  || — || August 28, 2006 || Socorro || LINEAR || EUN || align=right | 1.5 km || 
|-id=170 bgcolor=#E9E9E9
| 394170 ||  || — || August 25, 2006 || Socorro || LINEAR || — || align=right | 2.7 km || 
|-id=171 bgcolor=#E9E9E9
| 394171 ||  || — || August 19, 2006 || Kitt Peak || Spacewatch || — || align=right | 1.9 km || 
|-id=172 bgcolor=#E9E9E9
| 394172 ||  || — || August 19, 2006 || Kitt Peak || Spacewatch || — || align=right | 1.9 km || 
|-id=173 bgcolor=#E9E9E9
| 394173 ||  || — || August 29, 2006 || Anderson Mesa || LONEOS || (194) || align=right | 1.8 km || 
|-id=174 bgcolor=#E9E9E9
| 394174 ||  || — || August 29, 2006 || Catalina || CSS || — || align=right | 2.4 km || 
|-id=175 bgcolor=#E9E9E9
| 394175 ||  || — || August 18, 2006 || Kitt Peak || Spacewatch || — || align=right | 2.1 km || 
|-id=176 bgcolor=#E9E9E9
| 394176 ||  || — || September 12, 2006 || Catalina || CSS || — || align=right | 1.4 km || 
|-id=177 bgcolor=#E9E9E9
| 394177 ||  || — || September 14, 2006 || Palomar || NEAT || — || align=right | 2.3 km || 
|-id=178 bgcolor=#E9E9E9
| 394178 ||  || — || September 14, 2006 || Kitt Peak || Spacewatch || — || align=right | 2.1 km || 
|-id=179 bgcolor=#d6d6d6
| 394179 ||  || — || September 14, 2006 || Kitt Peak || Spacewatch || — || align=right | 2.4 km || 
|-id=180 bgcolor=#E9E9E9
| 394180 ||  || — || September 15, 2006 || Kitt Peak || Spacewatch || AGN || align=right | 1.2 km || 
|-id=181 bgcolor=#E9E9E9
| 394181 ||  || — || September 12, 2006 || Catalina || CSS || — || align=right | 2.8 km || 
|-id=182 bgcolor=#d6d6d6
| 394182 ||  || — || September 15, 2006 || Kitt Peak || Spacewatch || EOS || align=right | 2.5 km || 
|-id=183 bgcolor=#E9E9E9
| 394183 ||  || — || September 15, 2006 || Kitt Peak || Spacewatch || — || align=right | 2.2 km || 
|-id=184 bgcolor=#E9E9E9
| 394184 ||  || — || September 15, 2006 || Kitt Peak || Spacewatch || AGN || align=right | 1.3 km || 
|-id=185 bgcolor=#E9E9E9
| 394185 ||  || — || September 15, 2006 || Kitt Peak || Spacewatch || — || align=right | 2.2 km || 
|-id=186 bgcolor=#E9E9E9
| 394186 ||  || — || September 14, 2006 || Catalina || CSS || — || align=right | 2.2 km || 
|-id=187 bgcolor=#E9E9E9
| 394187 ||  || — || April 10, 2005 || Mount Lemmon || Mount Lemmon Survey || — || align=right | 1.9 km || 
|-id=188 bgcolor=#E9E9E9
| 394188 ||  || — || September 18, 2006 || Mayhill || A. Lowe || — || align=right | 1.8 km || 
|-id=189 bgcolor=#E9E9E9
| 394189 ||  || — || September 16, 2006 || Kitt Peak || Spacewatch || — || align=right | 2.2 km || 
|-id=190 bgcolor=#d6d6d6
| 394190 ||  || — || September 17, 2006 || Kitt Peak || Spacewatch || — || align=right | 2.5 km || 
|-id=191 bgcolor=#E9E9E9
| 394191 ||  || — || September 18, 2006 || Catalina || CSS || — || align=right | 2.8 km || 
|-id=192 bgcolor=#E9E9E9
| 394192 ||  || — || September 18, 2006 || Catalina || CSS || — || align=right | 1.3 km || 
|-id=193 bgcolor=#E9E9E9
| 394193 ||  || — || September 20, 2006 || Catalina || CSS || — || align=right | 2.1 km || 
|-id=194 bgcolor=#E9E9E9
| 394194 ||  || — || September 18, 2006 || Catalina || CSS || JUN || align=right | 1.3 km || 
|-id=195 bgcolor=#E9E9E9
| 394195 ||  || — || September 18, 2006 || Catalina || CSS || — || align=right | 1.7 km || 
|-id=196 bgcolor=#d6d6d6
| 394196 ||  || — || September 23, 2001 || Kitt Peak || Spacewatch || KOR || align=right | 1.7 km || 
|-id=197 bgcolor=#d6d6d6
| 394197 ||  || — || September 19, 2006 || Kitt Peak || Spacewatch || KOR || align=right | 1.2 km || 
|-id=198 bgcolor=#d6d6d6
| 394198 ||  || — || September 19, 2006 || Kitt Peak || Spacewatch || — || align=right | 2.4 km || 
|-id=199 bgcolor=#E9E9E9
| 394199 ||  || — || September 18, 2006 || Kitt Peak || Spacewatch || MRX || align=right | 1.1 km || 
|-id=200 bgcolor=#d6d6d6
| 394200 ||  || — || September 18, 2006 || Kitt Peak || Spacewatch || — || align=right | 2.2 km || 
|}

394201–394300 

|-bgcolor=#d6d6d6
| 394201 ||  || — || September 18, 2006 || Kitt Peak || Spacewatch || — || align=right | 2.8 km || 
|-id=202 bgcolor=#E9E9E9
| 394202 ||  || — || September 19, 2006 || Kitt Peak || Spacewatch || — || align=right | 1.3 km || 
|-id=203 bgcolor=#d6d6d6
| 394203 ||  || — || September 19, 2006 || Catalina || CSS || — || align=right | 4.7 km || 
|-id=204 bgcolor=#E9E9E9
| 394204 ||  || — || September 19, 2006 || Kitt Peak || Spacewatch || (1547) || align=right | 1.2 km || 
|-id=205 bgcolor=#E9E9E9
| 394205 ||  || — || September 19, 2006 || Anderson Mesa || LONEOS || — || align=right | 1.7 km || 
|-id=206 bgcolor=#d6d6d6
| 394206 ||  || — || September 25, 2006 || Kitt Peak || Spacewatch || — || align=right | 2.8 km || 
|-id=207 bgcolor=#E9E9E9
| 394207 ||  || — || September 25, 2006 || Kitt Peak || Spacewatch || — || align=right | 2.2 km || 
|-id=208 bgcolor=#E9E9E9
| 394208 ||  || — || September 26, 2006 || Kitt Peak || Spacewatch || — || align=right | 2.4 km || 
|-id=209 bgcolor=#d6d6d6
| 394209 ||  || — || April 13, 2004 || Kitt Peak || Spacewatch || — || align=right | 2.0 km || 
|-id=210 bgcolor=#E9E9E9
| 394210 ||  || — || August 28, 2006 || Kitt Peak || Spacewatch || — || align=right | 1.9 km || 
|-id=211 bgcolor=#d6d6d6
| 394211 ||  || — || September 26, 2006 || Kitt Peak || Spacewatch || — || align=right | 2.9 km || 
|-id=212 bgcolor=#E9E9E9
| 394212 ||  || — || September 18, 2006 || Kitt Peak || Spacewatch || — || align=right | 2.5 km || 
|-id=213 bgcolor=#E9E9E9
| 394213 ||  || — || September 26, 2006 || Kitt Peak || Spacewatch || — || align=right | 2.1 km || 
|-id=214 bgcolor=#d6d6d6
| 394214 ||  || — || September 18, 2006 || Kitt Peak || Spacewatch || KOR || align=right | 1.2 km || 
|-id=215 bgcolor=#d6d6d6
| 394215 ||  || — || September 26, 2006 || Kitt Peak || Spacewatch || KOR || align=right | 1.2 km || 
|-id=216 bgcolor=#E9E9E9
| 394216 ||  || — || September 26, 2006 || Mount Lemmon || Mount Lemmon Survey || — || align=right | 2.5 km || 
|-id=217 bgcolor=#d6d6d6
| 394217 ||  || — || September 26, 2006 || Kitt Peak || Spacewatch || — || align=right | 3.2 km || 
|-id=218 bgcolor=#d6d6d6
| 394218 ||  || — || September 26, 2006 || Mount Lemmon || Mount Lemmon Survey || EOS || align=right | 1.7 km || 
|-id=219 bgcolor=#E9E9E9
| 394219 ||  || — || September 27, 2006 || Catalina || CSS || EUN || align=right | 1.6 km || 
|-id=220 bgcolor=#d6d6d6
| 394220 ||  || — || September 17, 2006 || Kitt Peak || Spacewatch || — || align=right | 2.0 km || 
|-id=221 bgcolor=#E9E9E9
| 394221 ||  || — || September 27, 2006 || Kitt Peak || Spacewatch || — || align=right | 1.8 km || 
|-id=222 bgcolor=#E9E9E9
| 394222 ||  || — || September 27, 2006 || Kitt Peak || Spacewatch || AGN || align=right | 1.2 km || 
|-id=223 bgcolor=#E9E9E9
| 394223 ||  || — || September 27, 2006 || Kitt Peak || Spacewatch || — || align=right | 2.1 km || 
|-id=224 bgcolor=#E9E9E9
| 394224 ||  || — || September 27, 2006 || Kitt Peak || Spacewatch || HOF || align=right | 2.5 km || 
|-id=225 bgcolor=#d6d6d6
| 394225 ||  || — || September 27, 2006 || Kitt Peak || Spacewatch || — || align=right | 2.2 km || 
|-id=226 bgcolor=#d6d6d6
| 394226 ||  || — || September 27, 2006 || Kitt Peak || Spacewatch || — || align=right | 2.5 km || 
|-id=227 bgcolor=#d6d6d6
| 394227 ||  || — || September 27, 2006 || Kitt Peak || Spacewatch || — || align=right | 2.1 km || 
|-id=228 bgcolor=#E9E9E9
| 394228 ||  || — || September 28, 2006 || Mount Lemmon || Mount Lemmon Survey || — || align=right | 3.3 km || 
|-id=229 bgcolor=#d6d6d6
| 394229 ||  || — || September 28, 2006 || Kitt Peak || Spacewatch || KOR || align=right | 1.1 km || 
|-id=230 bgcolor=#d6d6d6
| 394230 ||  || — || September 28, 2006 || Kitt Peak || Spacewatch || — || align=right | 2.7 km || 
|-id=231 bgcolor=#d6d6d6
| 394231 ||  || — || September 30, 2006 || Mount Lemmon || Mount Lemmon Survey || — || align=right | 2.6 km || 
|-id=232 bgcolor=#E9E9E9
| 394232 ||  || — || September 15, 2006 || Kitt Peak || Spacewatch || HOF || align=right | 2.9 km || 
|-id=233 bgcolor=#E9E9E9
| 394233 ||  || — || September 30, 2006 || Catalina || CSS || — || align=right | 1.6 km || 
|-id=234 bgcolor=#d6d6d6
| 394234 ||  || — || September 16, 2006 || Apache Point || A. C. Becker || — || align=right | 2.2 km || 
|-id=235 bgcolor=#E9E9E9
| 394235 ||  || — || September 30, 2006 || Mount Lemmon || Mount Lemmon Survey ||  || align=right | 1.9 km || 
|-id=236 bgcolor=#d6d6d6
| 394236 ||  || — || September 25, 2006 || Mount Lemmon || Mount Lemmon Survey || — || align=right | 2.7 km || 
|-id=237 bgcolor=#d6d6d6
| 394237 ||  || — || September 30, 2006 || Mount Lemmon || Mount Lemmon Survey || — || align=right | 2.5 km || 
|-id=238 bgcolor=#d6d6d6
| 394238 ||  || — || September 30, 2006 || Mount Lemmon || Mount Lemmon Survey || — || align=right | 2.7 km || 
|-id=239 bgcolor=#d6d6d6
| 394239 ||  || — || September 30, 2006 || Mount Lemmon || Mount Lemmon Survey || — || align=right | 2.6 km || 
|-id=240 bgcolor=#E9E9E9
| 394240 ||  || — || September 17, 2006 || Kitt Peak || Spacewatch || — || align=right | 2.0 km || 
|-id=241 bgcolor=#E9E9E9
| 394241 ||  || — || May 20, 2005 || Mount Lemmon || Mount Lemmon Survey || — || align=right | 2.2 km || 
|-id=242 bgcolor=#d6d6d6
| 394242 ||  || — || October 10, 2006 || Palomar || NEAT || — || align=right | 3.3 km || 
|-id=243 bgcolor=#d6d6d6
| 394243 ||  || — || October 12, 2006 || Kitt Peak || Spacewatch || — || align=right | 2.5 km || 
|-id=244 bgcolor=#d6d6d6
| 394244 ||  || — || October 12, 2006 || Kitt Peak || Spacewatch || — || align=right | 2.5 km || 
|-id=245 bgcolor=#d6d6d6
| 394245 ||  || — || October 15, 2006 || Bergisch Gladbach || W. Bickel || — || align=right | 3.3 km || 
|-id=246 bgcolor=#d6d6d6
| 394246 ||  || — || September 25, 2006 || Catalina || CSS || — || align=right | 3.1 km || 
|-id=247 bgcolor=#E9E9E9
| 394247 ||  || — || October 12, 2006 || Kitt Peak || Spacewatch || — || align=right | 2.5 km || 
|-id=248 bgcolor=#d6d6d6
| 394248 ||  || — || October 2, 2006 || Mount Lemmon || Mount Lemmon Survey || EOS || align=right | 2.1 km || 
|-id=249 bgcolor=#d6d6d6
| 394249 ||  || — || October 15, 2006 || Kitt Peak || Spacewatch || 615 || align=right | 1.6 km || 
|-id=250 bgcolor=#E9E9E9
| 394250 ||  || — || October 1, 2006 || Apache Point || A. C. Becker || — || align=right | 2.2 km || 
|-id=251 bgcolor=#d6d6d6
| 394251 ||  || — || October 12, 2006 || Apache Point || A. C. Becker || BRA || align=right | 1.3 km || 
|-id=252 bgcolor=#d6d6d6
| 394252 ||  || — || October 3, 2006 || Mount Lemmon || Mount Lemmon Survey || — || align=right | 3.2 km || 
|-id=253 bgcolor=#E9E9E9
| 394253 ||  || — || October 4, 2006 || Mount Lemmon || Mount Lemmon Survey || — || align=right | 2.1 km || 
|-id=254 bgcolor=#E9E9E9
| 394254 ||  || — || October 2, 2006 || Kitt Peak || Spacewatch || AGN || align=right | 1.2 km || 
|-id=255 bgcolor=#d6d6d6
| 394255 ||  || — || September 25, 2006 || Kitt Peak || Spacewatch || — || align=right | 3.2 km || 
|-id=256 bgcolor=#d6d6d6
| 394256 ||  || — || October 16, 2006 || Kitt Peak || Spacewatch || EOS || align=right | 1.9 km || 
|-id=257 bgcolor=#d6d6d6
| 394257 ||  || — || October 16, 2006 || Kitt Peak || Spacewatch || — || align=right | 2.5 km || 
|-id=258 bgcolor=#d6d6d6
| 394258 ||  || — || October 16, 2006 || Kitt Peak || Spacewatch || KOR || align=right | 1.4 km || 
|-id=259 bgcolor=#E9E9E9
| 394259 ||  || — || October 17, 2006 || Kitt Peak || Spacewatch || — || align=right | 2.6 km || 
|-id=260 bgcolor=#d6d6d6
| 394260 ||  || — || September 27, 2006 || Mount Lemmon || Mount Lemmon Survey || — || align=right | 2.9 km || 
|-id=261 bgcolor=#d6d6d6
| 394261 ||  || — || July 22, 2006 || Mount Lemmon || Mount Lemmon Survey || — || align=right | 3.5 km || 
|-id=262 bgcolor=#d6d6d6
| 394262 ||  || — || October 17, 2006 || Kitt Peak || Spacewatch || EOS || align=right | 1.8 km || 
|-id=263 bgcolor=#E9E9E9
| 394263 ||  || — || October 3, 2006 || Mount Lemmon || Mount Lemmon Survey || HOF || align=right | 2.4 km || 
|-id=264 bgcolor=#E9E9E9
| 394264 ||  || — || October 18, 2006 || Kitt Peak || Spacewatch ||  || align=right | 2.4 km || 
|-id=265 bgcolor=#E9E9E9
| 394265 ||  || — || October 19, 2006 || Kitt Peak || Spacewatch || — || align=right | 2.9 km || 
|-id=266 bgcolor=#E9E9E9
| 394266 ||  || — || October 19, 2006 || Kitt Peak || Spacewatch || — || align=right | 2.3 km || 
|-id=267 bgcolor=#d6d6d6
| 394267 ||  || — || October 11, 2006 || Kitt Peak || Spacewatch || — || align=right | 2.7 km || 
|-id=268 bgcolor=#d6d6d6
| 394268 ||  || — || October 19, 2006 || Kitt Peak || Spacewatch || — || align=right | 2.4 km || 
|-id=269 bgcolor=#d6d6d6
| 394269 ||  || — || October 19, 2006 || Kitt Peak || Spacewatch || KOR || align=right | 1.3 km || 
|-id=270 bgcolor=#E9E9E9
| 394270 ||  || — || October 19, 2006 || Kitt Peak || Spacewatch || — || align=right | 1.8 km || 
|-id=271 bgcolor=#d6d6d6
| 394271 ||  || — || October 19, 2006 || Kitt Peak || Spacewatch || — || align=right | 2.9 km || 
|-id=272 bgcolor=#E9E9E9
| 394272 ||  || — || October 19, 2006 || Kitt Peak || Spacewatch || — || align=right | 2.2 km || 
|-id=273 bgcolor=#d6d6d6
| 394273 ||  || — || September 30, 2006 || Mount Lemmon || Mount Lemmon Survey || — || align=right | 2.3 km || 
|-id=274 bgcolor=#d6d6d6
| 394274 ||  || — || October 19, 2006 || Catalina || CSS || — || align=right | 4.1 km || 
|-id=275 bgcolor=#E9E9E9
| 394275 ||  || — || September 17, 2006 || Catalina || CSS || 526 || align=right | 2.8 km || 
|-id=276 bgcolor=#d6d6d6
| 394276 ||  || — || October 12, 2006 || Kitt Peak || Spacewatch || — || align=right | 2.6 km || 
|-id=277 bgcolor=#d6d6d6
| 394277 ||  || — || August 29, 2006 || Catalina || CSS || — || align=right | 3.9 km || 
|-id=278 bgcolor=#E9E9E9
| 394278 ||  || — || October 2, 2006 || Mount Lemmon || Mount Lemmon Survey || — || align=right | 2.9 km || 
|-id=279 bgcolor=#d6d6d6
| 394279 ||  || — || October 27, 2006 || Mount Lemmon || Mount Lemmon Survey || — || align=right | 3.0 km || 
|-id=280 bgcolor=#d6d6d6
| 394280 ||  || — || October 28, 2006 || Kitt Peak || Spacewatch || KOR || align=right | 1.4 km || 
|-id=281 bgcolor=#d6d6d6
| 394281 ||  || — || October 28, 2006 || Mount Lemmon || Mount Lemmon Survey || EOS || align=right | 2.0 km || 
|-id=282 bgcolor=#d6d6d6
| 394282 ||  || — || October 28, 2006 || Mount Lemmon || Mount Lemmon Survey || — || align=right | 2.3 km || 
|-id=283 bgcolor=#d6d6d6
| 394283 ||  || — || April 22, 2004 || Kitt Peak || Spacewatch || — || align=right | 2.4 km || 
|-id=284 bgcolor=#E9E9E9
| 394284 ||  || — || October 28, 2006 || Kitt Peak || Spacewatch || DOR || align=right | 2.2 km || 
|-id=285 bgcolor=#E9E9E9
| 394285 ||  || — || October 28, 2006 || Kitt Peak || Spacewatch ||  || align=right | 2.1 km || 
|-id=286 bgcolor=#d6d6d6
| 394286 ||  || — || October 20, 2006 || Kitt Peak || M. W. Buie || — || align=right | 3.0 km || 
|-id=287 bgcolor=#d6d6d6
| 394287 ||  || — || October 23, 2006 || Mount Lemmon || Mount Lemmon Survey || — || align=right | 3.0 km || 
|-id=288 bgcolor=#d6d6d6
| 394288 ||  || — || November 9, 2006 || Kitt Peak || Spacewatch || — || align=right | 2.6 km || 
|-id=289 bgcolor=#E9E9E9
| 394289 ||  || — || November 10, 2006 || Kitt Peak || Spacewatch || — || align=right | 1.7 km || 
|-id=290 bgcolor=#d6d6d6
| 394290 ||  || — || November 10, 2006 || Kitt Peak || Spacewatch || — || align=right | 2.9 km || 
|-id=291 bgcolor=#d6d6d6
| 394291 ||  || — || November 10, 2006 || Kitt Peak || Spacewatch || — || align=right | 2.9 km || 
|-id=292 bgcolor=#d6d6d6
| 394292 ||  || — || September 28, 2006 || Mount Lemmon || Mount Lemmon Survey || — || align=right | 3.1 km || 
|-id=293 bgcolor=#d6d6d6
| 394293 ||  || — || October 27, 2006 || Mount Lemmon || Mount Lemmon Survey || — || align=right | 2.6 km || 
|-id=294 bgcolor=#d6d6d6
| 394294 ||  || — || November 12, 2006 || Mount Lemmon || Mount Lemmon Survey || THM || align=right | 2.0 km || 
|-id=295 bgcolor=#d6d6d6
| 394295 ||  || — || November 11, 2006 || Kitt Peak || Spacewatch || EOS || align=right | 2.0 km || 
|-id=296 bgcolor=#d6d6d6
| 394296 ||  || — || November 11, 2006 || Kitt Peak || Spacewatch || BRA || align=right | 1.5 km || 
|-id=297 bgcolor=#d6d6d6
| 394297 ||  || — || November 11, 2006 || Kitt Peak || Spacewatch || — || align=right | 3.4 km || 
|-id=298 bgcolor=#d6d6d6
| 394298 ||  || — || October 4, 2006 || Mount Lemmon || Mount Lemmon Survey || EOS || align=right | 2.0 km || 
|-id=299 bgcolor=#d6d6d6
| 394299 ||  || — || October 28, 2006 || Mount Lemmon || Mount Lemmon Survey || TIR || align=right | 2.6 km || 
|-id=300 bgcolor=#d6d6d6
| 394300 ||  || — || September 28, 2006 || Mount Lemmon || Mount Lemmon Survey || — || align=right | 3.0 km || 
|}

394301–394400 

|-bgcolor=#d6d6d6
| 394301 ||  || — || September 26, 2006 || Mount Lemmon || Mount Lemmon Survey || EOS || align=right | 1.7 km || 
|-id=302 bgcolor=#d6d6d6
| 394302 ||  || — || January 22, 2002 || Kitt Peak || Spacewatch || THM || align=right | 2.3 km || 
|-id=303 bgcolor=#d6d6d6
| 394303 ||  || — || October 21, 2006 || Mount Lemmon || Mount Lemmon Survey || — || align=right | 3.3 km || 
|-id=304 bgcolor=#d6d6d6
| 394304 ||  || — || November 15, 2006 || Kitt Peak || Spacewatch || — || align=right | 2.6 km || 
|-id=305 bgcolor=#d6d6d6
| 394305 ||  || — || November 15, 2006 || Catalina || CSS || — || align=right | 3.1 km || 
|-id=306 bgcolor=#d6d6d6
| 394306 ||  || — || April 5, 2003 || Kitt Peak || Spacewatch || EOS || align=right | 2.0 km || 
|-id=307 bgcolor=#d6d6d6
| 394307 ||  || — || October 3, 2006 || Mount Lemmon || Mount Lemmon Survey || — || align=right | 2.8 km || 
|-id=308 bgcolor=#d6d6d6
| 394308 ||  || — || November 11, 2006 || Kitt Peak || Spacewatch || THM || align=right | 2.7 km || 
|-id=309 bgcolor=#d6d6d6
| 394309 ||  || — || November 16, 2006 || Kitt Peak || Spacewatch || — || align=right | 2.5 km || 
|-id=310 bgcolor=#d6d6d6
| 394310 ||  || — || November 16, 2006 || Mount Lemmon || Mount Lemmon Survey || — || align=right | 4.0 km || 
|-id=311 bgcolor=#d6d6d6
| 394311 ||  || — || November 16, 2006 || Mount Lemmon || Mount Lemmon Survey || — || align=right | 2.8 km || 
|-id=312 bgcolor=#d6d6d6
| 394312 ||  || — || October 4, 2006 || Mount Lemmon || Mount Lemmon Survey || EOS || align=right | 1.7 km || 
|-id=313 bgcolor=#d6d6d6
| 394313 ||  || — || September 27, 2006 || Mount Lemmon || Mount Lemmon Survey || — || align=right | 3.6 km || 
|-id=314 bgcolor=#d6d6d6
| 394314 ||  || — || November 17, 2006 || Mount Lemmon || Mount Lemmon Survey || EOS || align=right | 2.1 km || 
|-id=315 bgcolor=#d6d6d6
| 394315 ||  || — || October 23, 2006 || Mount Lemmon || Mount Lemmon Survey || EOS || align=right | 2.0 km || 
|-id=316 bgcolor=#d6d6d6
| 394316 ||  || — || October 28, 2006 || Mount Lemmon || Mount Lemmon Survey || — || align=right | 3.2 km || 
|-id=317 bgcolor=#d6d6d6
| 394317 ||  || — || November 1, 2006 || Mount Lemmon || Mount Lemmon Survey || EOS || align=right | 2.0 km || 
|-id=318 bgcolor=#d6d6d6
| 394318 ||  || — || November 18, 2006 || Kitt Peak || Spacewatch || — || align=right | 2.1 km || 
|-id=319 bgcolor=#d6d6d6
| 394319 ||  || — || November 18, 2006 || Mount Lemmon || Mount Lemmon Survey || — || align=right | 2.6 km || 
|-id=320 bgcolor=#d6d6d6
| 394320 ||  || — || November 19, 2006 || Kitt Peak || Spacewatch || HYG || align=right | 2.9 km || 
|-id=321 bgcolor=#d6d6d6
| 394321 ||  || — || October 28, 2006 || Mount Lemmon || Mount Lemmon Survey || THM || align=right | 2.4 km || 
|-id=322 bgcolor=#d6d6d6
| 394322 ||  || — || November 19, 2006 || Kitt Peak || Spacewatch || EOS || align=right | 2.2 km || 
|-id=323 bgcolor=#d6d6d6
| 394323 ||  || — || October 28, 2006 || Mount Lemmon || Mount Lemmon Survey || EOS || align=right | 1.9 km || 
|-id=324 bgcolor=#d6d6d6
| 394324 ||  || — || November 19, 2006 || Kitt Peak || Spacewatch || — || align=right | 3.0 km || 
|-id=325 bgcolor=#d6d6d6
| 394325 ||  || — || October 4, 2006 || Mount Lemmon || Mount Lemmon Survey || — || align=right | 2.7 km || 
|-id=326 bgcolor=#d6d6d6
| 394326 ||  || — || November 11, 2006 || Kitt Peak || Spacewatch || — || align=right | 3.2 km || 
|-id=327 bgcolor=#d6d6d6
| 394327 ||  || — || November 23, 2006 || Kitt Peak || Spacewatch || KOR || align=right | 1.3 km || 
|-id=328 bgcolor=#d6d6d6
| 394328 ||  || — || November 11, 2006 || Kitt Peak || Spacewatch || — || align=right | 2.5 km || 
|-id=329 bgcolor=#d6d6d6
| 394329 ||  || — || November 23, 2006 || Kitt Peak || Spacewatch || — || align=right | 2.5 km || 
|-id=330 bgcolor=#E9E9E9
| 394330 ||  || — || November 15, 2006 || Catalina || CSS || — || align=right | 2.3 km || 
|-id=331 bgcolor=#d6d6d6
| 394331 ||  || — || September 27, 2006 || Mount Lemmon || Mount Lemmon Survey || — || align=right | 3.9 km || 
|-id=332 bgcolor=#d6d6d6
| 394332 ||  || — || November 15, 2006 || Kitt Peak || Spacewatch || — || align=right | 3.4 km || 
|-id=333 bgcolor=#d6d6d6
| 394333 ||  || — || November 27, 2006 || Kitt Peak || Spacewatch || — || align=right | 1.9 km || 
|-id=334 bgcolor=#d6d6d6
| 394334 ||  || — || November 14, 2006 || Mount Lemmon || Mount Lemmon Survey || EOS || align=right | 2.0 km || 
|-id=335 bgcolor=#d6d6d6
| 394335 ||  || — || November 19, 2006 || Kitt Peak || Spacewatch || EOS || align=right | 4.2 km || 
|-id=336 bgcolor=#d6d6d6
| 394336 ||  || — || November 25, 2006 || Kitt Peak || Spacewatch || — || align=right | 3.2 km || 
|-id=337 bgcolor=#d6d6d6
| 394337 ||  || — || November 20, 2006 || Kitt Peak || Spacewatch || — || align=right | 2.9 km || 
|-id=338 bgcolor=#d6d6d6
| 394338 ||  || — || September 27, 2006 || Mount Lemmon || Mount Lemmon Survey || — || align=right | 3.3 km || 
|-id=339 bgcolor=#d6d6d6
| 394339 ||  || — || December 10, 2006 || Kitt Peak || Spacewatch || — || align=right | 2.5 km || 
|-id=340 bgcolor=#d6d6d6
| 394340 ||  || — || December 10, 2006 || Kitt Peak || Spacewatch || — || align=right | 4.0 km || 
|-id=341 bgcolor=#d6d6d6
| 394341 ||  || — || December 11, 2006 || Kitt Peak || Spacewatch || — || align=right | 3.4 km || 
|-id=342 bgcolor=#d6d6d6
| 394342 ||  || — || December 13, 2006 || Kitt Peak || Spacewatch || — || align=right | 3.9 km || 
|-id=343 bgcolor=#d6d6d6
| 394343 ||  || — || December 1, 2006 || Mount Lemmon || Mount Lemmon Survey || — || align=right | 3.0 km || 
|-id=344 bgcolor=#d6d6d6
| 394344 || 2006 YL || — || December 17, 2006 || 7300 Observatory || W. K. Y. Yeung || — || align=right | 5.1 km || 
|-id=345 bgcolor=#d6d6d6
| 394345 ||  || — || December 21, 2006 || Kitt Peak || Spacewatch || — || align=right | 4.0 km || 
|-id=346 bgcolor=#fefefe
| 394346 ||  || — || December 21, 2006 || Kitt Peak || Spacewatch || — || align=right data-sort-value="0.64" | 640 m || 
|-id=347 bgcolor=#fefefe
| 394347 ||  || — || January 8, 2007 || Mount Lemmon || Mount Lemmon Survey || — || align=right data-sort-value="0.54" | 540 m || 
|-id=348 bgcolor=#d6d6d6
| 394348 ||  || — || December 21, 2006 || Mount Lemmon || Mount Lemmon Survey || — || align=right | 4.3 km || 
|-id=349 bgcolor=#d6d6d6
| 394349 ||  || — || January 9, 2007 || Kitt Peak || Spacewatch || — || align=right | 5.4 km || 
|-id=350 bgcolor=#d6d6d6
| 394350 ||  || — || January 17, 2007 || Kitt Peak || Spacewatch || — || align=right | 3.2 km || 
|-id=351 bgcolor=#d6d6d6
| 394351 ||  || — || January 17, 2007 || Palomar || NEAT || — || align=right | 5.4 km || 
|-id=352 bgcolor=#fefefe
| 394352 ||  || — || January 17, 2007 || Catalina || CSS || — || align=right data-sort-value="0.98" | 980 m || 
|-id=353 bgcolor=#fefefe
| 394353 ||  || — || September 13, 2005 || Kitt Peak || Spacewatch || — || align=right data-sort-value="0.74" | 740 m || 
|-id=354 bgcolor=#fefefe
| 394354 ||  || — || January 24, 2007 || Mount Lemmon || Mount Lemmon Survey || — || align=right data-sort-value="0.72" | 720 m || 
|-id=355 bgcolor=#fefefe
| 394355 ||  || — || December 24, 2006 || Mount Lemmon || Mount Lemmon Survey || — || align=right data-sort-value="0.86" | 860 m || 
|-id=356 bgcolor=#fefefe
| 394356 ||  || — || January 26, 2007 || Kitt Peak || Spacewatch || — || align=right data-sort-value="0.64" | 640 m || 
|-id=357 bgcolor=#d6d6d6
| 394357 ||  || — || April 29, 2003 || Kitt Peak || Spacewatch || EOS || align=right | 3.3 km || 
|-id=358 bgcolor=#d6d6d6
| 394358 ||  || — || January 27, 2007 || Mount Lemmon || Mount Lemmon Survey || — || align=right | 3.3 km || 
|-id=359 bgcolor=#d6d6d6
| 394359 ||  || — || January 27, 2007 || Mount Lemmon || Mount Lemmon Survey || LUT || align=right | 5.4 km || 
|-id=360 bgcolor=#fefefe
| 394360 ||  || — || January 17, 2007 || Kitt Peak || Spacewatch || — || align=right data-sort-value="0.68" | 680 m || 
|-id=361 bgcolor=#fefefe
| 394361 ||  || — || February 7, 2007 || Mount Lemmon || Mount Lemmon Survey || — || align=right data-sort-value="0.73" | 730 m || 
|-id=362 bgcolor=#fefefe
| 394362 ||  || — || February 7, 2007 || Kitt Peak || Spacewatch || — || align=right data-sort-value="0.62" | 620 m || 
|-id=363 bgcolor=#fefefe
| 394363 ||  || — || February 10, 2007 || Catalina || CSS || — || align=right | 2.4 km || 
|-id=364 bgcolor=#fefefe
| 394364 ||  || — || February 18, 2007 || Calvin-Rehoboth || Calvin–Rehoboth Obs. || — || align=right data-sort-value="0.78" | 780 m || 
|-id=365 bgcolor=#fefefe
| 394365 ||  || — || January 27, 2007 || Mount Lemmon || Mount Lemmon Survey || — || align=right data-sort-value="0.82" | 820 m || 
|-id=366 bgcolor=#fefefe
| 394366 ||  || — || February 17, 2007 || Kitt Peak || Spacewatch || — || align=right data-sort-value="0.64" | 640 m || 
|-id=367 bgcolor=#fefefe
| 394367 ||  || — || February 17, 2007 || Kitt Peak || Spacewatch || — || align=right data-sort-value="0.65" | 650 m || 
|-id=368 bgcolor=#fefefe
| 394368 ||  || — || February 17, 2007 || Kitt Peak || Spacewatch || — || align=right data-sort-value="0.89" | 890 m || 
|-id=369 bgcolor=#fefefe
| 394369 ||  || — || February 17, 2007 || Kitt Peak || Spacewatch || — || align=right data-sort-value="0.59" | 590 m || 
|-id=370 bgcolor=#fefefe
| 394370 ||  || — || February 17, 2007 || Kitt Peak || Spacewatch || — || align=right data-sort-value="0.78" | 780 m || 
|-id=371 bgcolor=#fefefe
| 394371 ||  || — || February 21, 2007 || Socorro || LINEAR || — || align=right data-sort-value="0.94" | 940 m || 
|-id=372 bgcolor=#fefefe
| 394372 ||  || — || February 21, 2007 || Mount Lemmon || Mount Lemmon Survey || — || align=right data-sort-value="0.68" | 680 m || 
|-id=373 bgcolor=#fefefe
| 394373 ||  || — || February 21, 2007 || Kitt Peak || Spacewatch || — || align=right data-sort-value="0.94" | 940 m || 
|-id=374 bgcolor=#fefefe
| 394374 ||  || — || February 21, 2007 || Kitt Peak || Spacewatch || — || align=right data-sort-value="0.59" | 590 m || 
|-id=375 bgcolor=#fefefe
| 394375 ||  || — || February 22, 2007 || Kitt Peak || Spacewatch || — || align=right data-sort-value="0.69" | 690 m || 
|-id=376 bgcolor=#fefefe
| 394376 ||  || — || February 21, 2007 || Kitt Peak || Spacewatch || — || align=right data-sort-value="0.69" | 690 m || 
|-id=377 bgcolor=#fefefe
| 394377 ||  || — || February 23, 2007 || Mount Lemmon || Mount Lemmon Survey || — || align=right data-sort-value="0.60" | 600 m || 
|-id=378 bgcolor=#fefefe
| 394378 ||  || — || February 17, 2007 || Kitt Peak || Spacewatch || — || align=right data-sort-value="0.73" | 730 m || 
|-id=379 bgcolor=#fefefe
| 394379 ||  || — || February 25, 2007 || Kitt Peak || Spacewatch || — || align=right data-sort-value="0.86" | 860 m || 
|-id=380 bgcolor=#fefefe
| 394380 ||  || — || March 9, 2007 || Kitt Peak || Spacewatch || — || align=right data-sort-value="0.73" | 730 m || 
|-id=381 bgcolor=#fefefe
| 394381 ||  || — || March 9, 2007 || Mount Lemmon || Mount Lemmon Survey || — || align=right data-sort-value="0.67" | 670 m || 
|-id=382 bgcolor=#fefefe
| 394382 ||  || — || February 8, 2007 || Kitt Peak || Spacewatch || — || align=right data-sort-value="0.67" | 670 m || 
|-id=383 bgcolor=#fefefe
| 394383 ||  || — || February 26, 2007 || Mount Lemmon || Mount Lemmon Survey || — || align=right data-sort-value="0.86" | 860 m || 
|-id=384 bgcolor=#fefefe
| 394384 ||  || — || February 17, 2007 || Kitt Peak || Spacewatch || — || align=right data-sort-value="0.68" | 680 m || 
|-id=385 bgcolor=#fefefe
| 394385 ||  || — || March 9, 2007 || Kitt Peak || Spacewatch || (2076) || align=right data-sort-value="0.71" | 710 m || 
|-id=386 bgcolor=#fefefe
| 394386 ||  || — || March 9, 2007 || Kitt Peak || Spacewatch || — || align=right data-sort-value="0.55" | 550 m || 
|-id=387 bgcolor=#fefefe
| 394387 ||  || — || March 11, 2007 || Catalina || CSS || — || align=right data-sort-value="0.98" | 980 m || 
|-id=388 bgcolor=#fefefe
| 394388 ||  || — || March 9, 2007 || Mount Lemmon || Mount Lemmon Survey || — || align=right data-sort-value="0.67" | 670 m || 
|-id=389 bgcolor=#fefefe
| 394389 ||  || — || March 10, 2007 || Kitt Peak || Spacewatch || — || align=right | 1.3 km || 
|-id=390 bgcolor=#fefefe
| 394390 ||  || — || March 10, 2007 || Kitt Peak || Spacewatch || — || align=right data-sort-value="0.71" | 710 m || 
|-id=391 bgcolor=#d6d6d6
| 394391 ||  || — || March 12, 2007 || Kitt Peak || Spacewatch || — || align=right | 5.0 km || 
|-id=392 bgcolor=#FFC2E0
| 394392 ||  || — || March 15, 2007 || Siding Spring || SSS || ATE || align=right data-sort-value="0.64" | 640 m || 
|-id=393 bgcolor=#fefefe
| 394393 ||  || — || March 10, 2007 || Kitt Peak || Spacewatch || — || align=right data-sort-value="0.73" | 730 m || 
|-id=394 bgcolor=#fefefe
| 394394 ||  || — || March 10, 2007 || Mount Lemmon || Mount Lemmon Survey || — || align=right data-sort-value="0.72" | 720 m || 
|-id=395 bgcolor=#fefefe
| 394395 ||  || — || March 11, 2007 || Kitt Peak || Spacewatch || — || align=right data-sort-value="0.78" | 780 m || 
|-id=396 bgcolor=#fefefe
| 394396 ||  || — || March 11, 2007 || Kitt Peak || Spacewatch || — || align=right data-sort-value="0.72" | 720 m || 
|-id=397 bgcolor=#fefefe
| 394397 ||  || — || March 9, 2007 || Mount Lemmon || Mount Lemmon Survey || — || align=right data-sort-value="0.56" | 560 m || 
|-id=398 bgcolor=#fefefe
| 394398 ||  || — || March 10, 2007 || Mount Lemmon || Mount Lemmon Survey || — || align=right data-sort-value="0.68" | 680 m || 
|-id=399 bgcolor=#fefefe
| 394399 ||  || — || March 14, 2007 || Kitt Peak || Spacewatch || V || align=right data-sort-value="0.64" | 640 m || 
|-id=400 bgcolor=#fefefe
| 394400 ||  || — || March 15, 2007 || Kitt Peak || Spacewatch || NYS || align=right data-sort-value="0.57" | 570 m || 
|}

394401–394500 

|-bgcolor=#fefefe
| 394401 ||  || — || March 20, 2007 || Mount Lemmon || Mount Lemmon Survey || — || align=right | 1.1 km || 
|-id=402 bgcolor=#fefefe
| 394402 ||  || — || April 11, 2007 || Mount Lemmon || Mount Lemmon Survey || — || align=right data-sort-value="0.84" | 840 m || 
|-id=403 bgcolor=#fefefe
| 394403 ||  || — || April 11, 2007 || Mount Lemmon || Mount Lemmon Survey || V || align=right data-sort-value="0.59" | 590 m || 
|-id=404 bgcolor=#fefefe
| 394404 ||  || — || April 11, 2007 || Kitt Peak || Spacewatch || — || align=right data-sort-value="0.82" | 820 m || 
|-id=405 bgcolor=#fefefe
| 394405 ||  || — || March 10, 2007 || Kitt Peak || Spacewatch || — || align=right data-sort-value="0.55" | 550 m || 
|-id=406 bgcolor=#fefefe
| 394406 ||  || — || April 14, 2007 || Kitt Peak || Spacewatch || — || align=right data-sort-value="0.77" | 770 m || 
|-id=407 bgcolor=#fefefe
| 394407 ||  || — || April 14, 2007 || Kitt Peak || Spacewatch || — || align=right data-sort-value="0.65" | 650 m || 
|-id=408 bgcolor=#fefefe
| 394408 ||  || — || April 14, 2007 || Kitt Peak || Spacewatch || — || align=right data-sort-value="0.98" | 980 m || 
|-id=409 bgcolor=#fefefe
| 394409 ||  || — || March 14, 2007 || Mount Lemmon || Mount Lemmon Survey || — || align=right data-sort-value="0.67" | 670 m || 
|-id=410 bgcolor=#fefefe
| 394410 ||  || — || April 15, 2007 || Kitt Peak || Spacewatch || — || align=right data-sort-value="0.80" | 800 m || 
|-id=411 bgcolor=#fefefe
| 394411 ||  || — || April 15, 2007 || Mount Lemmon || Mount Lemmon Survey || — || align=right data-sort-value="0.62" | 620 m || 
|-id=412 bgcolor=#fefefe
| 394412 ||  || — || September 22, 2001 || Kitt Peak || Spacewatch || V || align=right data-sort-value="0.73" | 730 m || 
|-id=413 bgcolor=#fefefe
| 394413 ||  || — || April 15, 2007 || Kitt Peak || Spacewatch || — || align=right | 1.0 km || 
|-id=414 bgcolor=#fefefe
| 394414 ||  || — || April 15, 2007 || Kitt Peak || Spacewatch || — || align=right data-sort-value="0.75" | 750 m || 
|-id=415 bgcolor=#fefefe
| 394415 ||  || — || April 15, 2007 || Mount Lemmon || Mount Lemmon Survey || — || align=right data-sort-value="0.83" | 830 m || 
|-id=416 bgcolor=#fefefe
| 394416 ||  || — || April 18, 2007 || Kitt Peak || Spacewatch || — || align=right data-sort-value="0.99" | 990 m || 
|-id=417 bgcolor=#fefefe
| 394417 ||  || — || April 18, 2007 || Kitt Peak || Spacewatch || V || align=right data-sort-value="0.73" | 730 m || 
|-id=418 bgcolor=#fefefe
| 394418 ||  || — || April 23, 2007 || Catalina || CSS || — || align=right data-sort-value="0.98" | 980 m || 
|-id=419 bgcolor=#fefefe
| 394419 ||  || — || April 22, 2007 || Mount Lemmon || Mount Lemmon Survey || V || align=right data-sort-value="0.73" | 730 m || 
|-id=420 bgcolor=#FA8072
| 394420 ||  || — || April 24, 2007 || Kitt Peak || Spacewatch || — || align=right data-sort-value="0.57" | 570 m || 
|-id=421 bgcolor=#fefefe
| 394421 ||  || — || April 22, 2007 || Kitt Peak || Spacewatch || — || align=right data-sort-value="0.86" | 860 m || 
|-id=422 bgcolor=#fefefe
| 394422 ||  || — || March 13, 2007 || Mount Lemmon || Mount Lemmon Survey || NYS || align=right data-sort-value="0.66" | 660 m || 
|-id=423 bgcolor=#fefefe
| 394423 ||  || — || May 7, 2007 || Kitt Peak || Spacewatch || NYS || align=right data-sort-value="0.70" | 700 m || 
|-id=424 bgcolor=#fefefe
| 394424 ||  || — || April 15, 2007 || Kitt Peak || Spacewatch || NYS || align=right data-sort-value="0.80" | 800 m || 
|-id=425 bgcolor=#fefefe
| 394425 ||  || — || May 10, 2007 || Kitt Peak || Spacewatch || — || align=right | 1.7 km || 
|-id=426 bgcolor=#fefefe
| 394426 ||  || — || April 18, 2007 || Kitt Peak || Spacewatch || — || align=right data-sort-value="0.87" | 870 m || 
|-id=427 bgcolor=#fefefe
| 394427 ||  || — || May 12, 2007 || Kitt Peak || Spacewatch || — || align=right data-sort-value="0.84" | 840 m || 
|-id=428 bgcolor=#fefefe
| 394428 || 2007 KA || — || May 16, 2007 || Wrightwood || J. W. Young || — || align=right data-sort-value="0.96" | 960 m || 
|-id=429 bgcolor=#fefefe
| 394429 ||  || — || June 8, 2007 || Kitt Peak || Spacewatch || — || align=right data-sort-value="0.78" | 780 m || 
|-id=430 bgcolor=#fefefe
| 394430 ||  || — || June 9, 2007 || Kitt Peak || Spacewatch || — || align=right data-sort-value="0.98" | 980 m || 
|-id=431 bgcolor=#fefefe
| 394431 ||  || — || June 18, 2007 || Kitt Peak || Spacewatch || — || align=right data-sort-value="0.77" | 770 m || 
|-id=432 bgcolor=#fefefe
| 394432 || 2007 NC || — || July 6, 2007 || Pla D'Arguines || R. Ferrando || — || align=right | 1.1 km || 
|-id=433 bgcolor=#fefefe
| 394433 ||  || — || July 20, 2007 || Socorro || LINEAR || NYS || align=right data-sort-value="0.81" | 810 m || 
|-id=434 bgcolor=#fefefe
| 394434 ||  || — || August 7, 2007 || Eskridge || G. Hug || MAS || align=right data-sort-value="0.78" | 780 m || 
|-id=435 bgcolor=#fefefe
| 394435 ||  || — || August 8, 2007 || Siding Spring || SSS || — || align=right | 2.7 km || 
|-id=436 bgcolor=#fefefe
| 394436 ||  || — || August 8, 2007 || Socorro || LINEAR || — || align=right data-sort-value="0.94" | 940 m || 
|-id=437 bgcolor=#E9E9E9
| 394437 ||  || — || August 12, 2007 || Great Shefford || P. Birtwhistle || (5) || align=right data-sort-value="0.70" | 700 m || 
|-id=438 bgcolor=#FA8072
| 394438 ||  || — || August 9, 2007 || Socorro || LINEAR || — || align=right | 1.1 km || 
|-id=439 bgcolor=#fefefe
| 394439 ||  || — || August 12, 2007 || Socorro || LINEAR || — || align=right data-sort-value="0.82" | 820 m || 
|-id=440 bgcolor=#fefefe
| 394440 ||  || — || August 9, 2007 || Socorro || LINEAR || — || align=right data-sort-value="0.90" | 900 m || 
|-id=441 bgcolor=#fefefe
| 394441 ||  || — || August 10, 2007 || Kitt Peak || Spacewatch || — || align=right data-sort-value="0.89" | 890 m || 
|-id=442 bgcolor=#fefefe
| 394442 ||  || — || August 10, 2007 || Kitt Peak || Spacewatch || — || align=right data-sort-value="0.75" | 750 m || 
|-id=443 bgcolor=#fefefe
| 394443 ||  || — || August 22, 2007 || Socorro || LINEAR || — || align=right data-sort-value="0.80" | 800 m || 
|-id=444 bgcolor=#fefefe
| 394444 ||  || — || September 5, 2007 || Catalina || CSS || — || align=right data-sort-value="0.94" | 940 m || 
|-id=445 bgcolor=#E9E9E9
| 394445 Unst ||  ||  || September 11, 2007 || Vicques || M. Ory || — || align=right | 1.8 km || 
|-id=446 bgcolor=#fefefe
| 394446 ||  || — || September 3, 2007 || Catalina || CSS || — || align=right | 1.9 km || 
|-id=447 bgcolor=#fefefe
| 394447 ||  || — || September 3, 2007 || Catalina || CSS || — || align=right | 1.1 km || 
|-id=448 bgcolor=#fefefe
| 394448 ||  || — || September 5, 2007 || Anderson Mesa || LONEOS || — || align=right | 1.1 km || 
|-id=449 bgcolor=#fefefe
| 394449 ||  || — || September 10, 2007 || Mount Lemmon || Mount Lemmon Survey || — || align=right data-sort-value="0.82" | 820 m || 
|-id=450 bgcolor=#E9E9E9
| 394450 ||  || — || September 10, 2007 || Mount Lemmon || Mount Lemmon Survey || — || align=right | 1.3 km || 
|-id=451 bgcolor=#fefefe
| 394451 ||  || — || September 10, 2007 || Kitt Peak || Spacewatch || — || align=right | 1.1 km || 
|-id=452 bgcolor=#E9E9E9
| 394452 ||  || — || September 11, 2007 || Kitt Peak || Spacewatch || MAR || align=right | 1.0 km || 
|-id=453 bgcolor=#E9E9E9
| 394453 ||  || — || September 12, 2007 || Mount Lemmon || Mount Lemmon Survey || — || align=right | 1.4 km || 
|-id=454 bgcolor=#fefefe
| 394454 ||  || — || September 12, 2007 || Mount Lemmon || Mount Lemmon Survey || MAS || align=right data-sort-value="0.77" | 770 m || 
|-id=455 bgcolor=#E9E9E9
| 394455 ||  || — || September 10, 2007 || Mount Lemmon || Mount Lemmon Survey || EUN || align=right | 1.4 km || 
|-id=456 bgcolor=#E9E9E9
| 394456 ||  || — || September 10, 2007 || Catalina || CSS || EUN || align=right | 1.2 km || 
|-id=457 bgcolor=#fefefe
| 394457 ||  || — || September 4, 2007 || Catalina || CSS || — || align=right | 1.1 km || 
|-id=458 bgcolor=#E9E9E9
| 394458 ||  || — || April 30, 2006 || Kitt Peak || Spacewatch || — || align=right data-sort-value="0.85" | 850 m || 
|-id=459 bgcolor=#E9E9E9
| 394459 ||  || — || September 13, 2007 || Kitt Peak || Spacewatch || MAR || align=right data-sort-value="0.80" | 800 m || 
|-id=460 bgcolor=#E9E9E9
| 394460 ||  || — || September 11, 2007 || Kitt Peak || Spacewatch || — || align=right | 1.2 km || 
|-id=461 bgcolor=#fefefe
| 394461 ||  || — || September 14, 2007 || Catalina || CSS || (5026) || align=right | 1.0 km || 
|-id=462 bgcolor=#fefefe
| 394462 ||  || — || March 9, 2002 || Kitt Peak || Spacewatch || — || align=right data-sort-value="0.75" | 750 m || 
|-id=463 bgcolor=#E9E9E9
| 394463 ||  || — || September 15, 2007 || Kitt Peak || Spacewatch || — || align=right | 1.9 km || 
|-id=464 bgcolor=#E9E9E9
| 394464 ||  || — || September 15, 2007 || Mount Lemmon || Mount Lemmon Survey || MRX || align=right | 1.4 km || 
|-id=465 bgcolor=#E9E9E9
| 394465 ||  || — || September 9, 2007 || Mount Lemmon || Mount Lemmon Survey || KON || align=right | 2.6 km || 
|-id=466 bgcolor=#E9E9E9
| 394466 ||  || — || September 10, 2007 || Mount Lemmon || Mount Lemmon Survey || — || align=right data-sort-value="0.83" | 830 m || 
|-id=467 bgcolor=#E9E9E9
| 394467 ||  || — || September 11, 2007 || Mount Lemmon || Mount Lemmon Survey || — || align=right | 1.4 km || 
|-id=468 bgcolor=#E9E9E9
| 394468 ||  || — || September 8, 2007 || Catalina || CSS || — || align=right | 1.9 km || 
|-id=469 bgcolor=#E9E9E9
| 394469 ||  || — || September 20, 2007 || Catalina || CSS || — || align=right | 1.9 km || 
|-id=470 bgcolor=#E9E9E9
| 394470 ||  || — || October 6, 2007 || 7300 || W. K. Y. Yeung || — || align=right | 2.4 km || 
|-id=471 bgcolor=#E9E9E9
| 394471 ||  || — || September 19, 1998 || Caussols || ODAS || HNS || align=right | 1.5 km || 
|-id=472 bgcolor=#E9E9E9
| 394472 ||  || — || October 6, 2007 || Socorro || LINEAR || — || align=right | 1.7 km || 
|-id=473 bgcolor=#E9E9E9
| 394473 ||  || — || October 9, 2007 || 7300 || W. K. Y. Yeung || — || align=right | 1.8 km || 
|-id=474 bgcolor=#FA8072
| 394474 ||  || — || October 4, 2007 || Kitt Peak || Spacewatch || — || align=right | 1.1 km || 
|-id=475 bgcolor=#E9E9E9
| 394475 ||  || — || October 4, 2007 || Kitt Peak || Spacewatch || — || align=right | 1.5 km || 
|-id=476 bgcolor=#E9E9E9
| 394476 ||  || — || October 4, 2007 || Kitt Peak || Spacewatch || — || align=right | 1.7 km || 
|-id=477 bgcolor=#E9E9E9
| 394477 ||  || — || October 6, 2007 || Kitt Peak || Spacewatch || — || align=right | 1.6 km || 
|-id=478 bgcolor=#E9E9E9
| 394478 ||  || — || October 6, 2007 || Kitt Peak || Spacewatch || KON || align=right | 2.7 km || 
|-id=479 bgcolor=#E9E9E9
| 394479 ||  || — || October 4, 2007 || Kitt Peak || Spacewatch || — || align=right | 1.4 km || 
|-id=480 bgcolor=#E9E9E9
| 394480 ||  || — || October 4, 2007 || Kitt Peak || Spacewatch || — || align=right | 2.3 km || 
|-id=481 bgcolor=#E9E9E9
| 394481 ||  || — || October 4, 2007 || Kitt Peak || Spacewatch || — || align=right data-sort-value="0.98" | 980 m || 
|-id=482 bgcolor=#E9E9E9
| 394482 ||  || — || October 4, 2007 || Kitt Peak || Spacewatch || — || align=right | 1.5 km || 
|-id=483 bgcolor=#E9E9E9
| 394483 ||  || — || October 12, 2007 || 7300 || W. K. Y. Yeung || — || align=right | 2.3 km || 
|-id=484 bgcolor=#E9E9E9
| 394484 ||  || — || October 14, 2007 || Altschwendt || W. Ries || — || align=right | 2.2 km || 
|-id=485 bgcolor=#E9E9E9
| 394485 ||  || — || September 9, 2007 || Mount Lemmon || Mount Lemmon Survey || — || align=right | 2.3 km || 
|-id=486 bgcolor=#E9E9E9
| 394486 ||  || — || October 8, 2007 || Catalina || CSS || — || align=right | 1.7 km || 
|-id=487 bgcolor=#E9E9E9
| 394487 ||  || — || October 8, 2007 || Mount Lemmon || Mount Lemmon Survey || HNS || align=right | 1.2 km || 
|-id=488 bgcolor=#E9E9E9
| 394488 ||  || — || October 8, 2007 || Mount Lemmon || Mount Lemmon Survey || — || align=right data-sort-value="0.93" | 930 m || 
|-id=489 bgcolor=#E9E9E9
| 394489 ||  || — || October 4, 2007 || Kitt Peak || Spacewatch || — || align=right | 2.2 km || 
|-id=490 bgcolor=#E9E9E9
| 394490 ||  || — || September 15, 2007 || Anderson Mesa || LONEOS || — || align=right | 2.6 km || 
|-id=491 bgcolor=#E9E9E9
| 394491 ||  || — || September 12, 2007 || Mount Lemmon || Mount Lemmon Survey || — || align=right | 2.4 km || 
|-id=492 bgcolor=#E9E9E9
| 394492 ||  || — || October 9, 2007 || Kitt Peak || Spacewatch || — || align=right | 2.4 km || 
|-id=493 bgcolor=#E9E9E9
| 394493 ||  || — || October 6, 2007 || Socorro || LINEAR || — || align=right | 1.5 km || 
|-id=494 bgcolor=#E9E9E9
| 394494 ||  || — || October 9, 2007 || Socorro || LINEAR || EUN || align=right | 1.3 km || 
|-id=495 bgcolor=#E9E9E9
| 394495 ||  || — || October 12, 2007 || Socorro || LINEAR || HNS || align=right | 1.5 km || 
|-id=496 bgcolor=#E9E9E9
| 394496 ||  || — || October 2, 2007 || Antares || ARO || — || align=right | 2.2 km || 
|-id=497 bgcolor=#E9E9E9
| 394497 ||  || — || September 12, 2007 || Catalina || CSS || EUN || align=right | 1.4 km || 
|-id=498 bgcolor=#E9E9E9
| 394498 ||  || — || October 7, 2007 || Mount Lemmon || Mount Lemmon Survey || — || align=right | 2.0 km || 
|-id=499 bgcolor=#E9E9E9
| 394499 ||  || — || September 18, 2007 || Mount Lemmon || Mount Lemmon Survey || — || align=right | 1.4 km || 
|-id=500 bgcolor=#E9E9E9
| 394500 ||  || — || October 6, 2007 || Kitt Peak || Spacewatch || — || align=right data-sort-value="0.98" | 980 m || 
|}

394501–394600 

|-bgcolor=#E9E9E9
| 394501 ||  || — || October 7, 2007 || Kitt Peak || Spacewatch || — || align=right | 1.4 km || 
|-id=502 bgcolor=#E9E9E9
| 394502 ||  || — || October 7, 2007 || Kitt Peak || Spacewatch || — || align=right | 1.0 km || 
|-id=503 bgcolor=#E9E9E9
| 394503 ||  || — || October 8, 2007 || Mount Lemmon || Mount Lemmon Survey || (194) || align=right | 1.1 km || 
|-id=504 bgcolor=#d6d6d6
| 394504 ||  || — || October 8, 2007 || Kitt Peak || Spacewatch || — || align=right | 2.8 km || 
|-id=505 bgcolor=#E9E9E9
| 394505 ||  || — || September 9, 2007 || Mount Lemmon || Mount Lemmon Survey || — || align=right | 1.3 km || 
|-id=506 bgcolor=#E9E9E9
| 394506 ||  || — || October 10, 2007 || Kitt Peak || Spacewatch || — || align=right | 2.3 km || 
|-id=507 bgcolor=#E9E9E9
| 394507 ||  || — || October 8, 2007 || Catalina || CSS || — || align=right | 2.9 km || 
|-id=508 bgcolor=#E9E9E9
| 394508 ||  || — || October 10, 2007 || Kitt Peak || Spacewatch || — || align=right | 1.4 km || 
|-id=509 bgcolor=#E9E9E9
| 394509 ||  || — || October 10, 2007 || Mount Lemmon || Mount Lemmon Survey || — || align=right data-sort-value="0.96" | 960 m || 
|-id=510 bgcolor=#E9E9E9
| 394510 ||  || — || October 10, 2007 || Kitt Peak || Spacewatch || — || align=right | 1.3 km || 
|-id=511 bgcolor=#E9E9E9
| 394511 ||  || — || October 6, 2007 || Kitt Peak || Spacewatch || — || align=right | 1.0 km || 
|-id=512 bgcolor=#fefefe
| 394512 ||  || — || October 10, 2007 || Anderson Mesa || LONEOS || — || align=right data-sort-value="0.78" | 780 m || 
|-id=513 bgcolor=#E9E9E9
| 394513 ||  || — || September 19, 2007 || Kitt Peak || Spacewatch || — || align=right | 1.3 km || 
|-id=514 bgcolor=#fefefe
| 394514 ||  || — || August 9, 2007 || Socorro || LINEAR || NYS || align=right data-sort-value="0.81" | 810 m || 
|-id=515 bgcolor=#E9E9E9
| 394515 ||  || — || September 14, 2007 || Mount Lemmon || Mount Lemmon Survey || — || align=right | 2.4 km || 
|-id=516 bgcolor=#E9E9E9
| 394516 ||  || — || October 12, 2007 || Kitt Peak || Spacewatch || — || align=right | 1.4 km || 
|-id=517 bgcolor=#E9E9E9
| 394517 ||  || — || October 12, 2007 || Kitt Peak || Spacewatch || — || align=right | 1.9 km || 
|-id=518 bgcolor=#E9E9E9
| 394518 ||  || — || October 11, 2007 || Mount Lemmon || Mount Lemmon Survey || — || align=right data-sort-value="0.87" | 870 m || 
|-id=519 bgcolor=#E9E9E9
| 394519 ||  || — || October 11, 2007 || Kitt Peak || Spacewatch || — || align=right | 1.4 km || 
|-id=520 bgcolor=#E9E9E9
| 394520 ||  || — || June 19, 2006 || Mount Lemmon || Mount Lemmon Survey || — || align=right | 1.9 km || 
|-id=521 bgcolor=#E9E9E9
| 394521 ||  || — || October 11, 2007 || Kitt Peak || Spacewatch || — || align=right | 2.3 km || 
|-id=522 bgcolor=#E9E9E9
| 394522 ||  || — || October 14, 2007 || Mount Lemmon || Mount Lemmon Survey || — || align=right | 1.4 km || 
|-id=523 bgcolor=#E9E9E9
| 394523 ||  || — || October 14, 2007 || Mount Lemmon || Mount Lemmon Survey || — || align=right | 2.1 km || 
|-id=524 bgcolor=#E9E9E9
| 394524 ||  || — || October 14, 2007 || Mount Lemmon || Mount Lemmon Survey || — || align=right | 1.9 km || 
|-id=525 bgcolor=#E9E9E9
| 394525 ||  || — || October 8, 2007 || Mount Lemmon || Mount Lemmon Survey || — || align=right | 1.9 km || 
|-id=526 bgcolor=#E9E9E9
| 394526 ||  || — || October 14, 2007 || Kitt Peak || Spacewatch || — || align=right | 1.5 km || 
|-id=527 bgcolor=#E9E9E9
| 394527 ||  || — || October 14, 2007 || Kitt Peak || Spacewatch || — || align=right | 1.7 km || 
|-id=528 bgcolor=#E9E9E9
| 394528 ||  || — || October 15, 2007 || Catalina || CSS || — || align=right | 1.8 km || 
|-id=529 bgcolor=#E9E9E9
| 394529 ||  || — || October 15, 2007 || Catalina || CSS || — || align=right | 1.9 km || 
|-id=530 bgcolor=#E9E9E9
| 394530 ||  || — || September 14, 2007 || Catalina || CSS || — || align=right | 2.9 km || 
|-id=531 bgcolor=#E9E9E9
| 394531 ||  || — || October 15, 2007 || Anderson Mesa || LONEOS || — || align=right | 2.4 km || 
|-id=532 bgcolor=#E9E9E9
| 394532 ||  || — || October 8, 2007 || Kitt Peak || Spacewatch || — || align=right | 1.3 km || 
|-id=533 bgcolor=#E9E9E9
| 394533 ||  || — || October 10, 2007 || Kitt Peak || Spacewatch || — || align=right | 1.7 km || 
|-id=534 bgcolor=#E9E9E9
| 394534 ||  || — || May 8, 2006 || Kitt Peak || Spacewatch || — || align=right data-sort-value="0.94" | 940 m || 
|-id=535 bgcolor=#E9E9E9
| 394535 ||  || — || October 10, 2007 || Catalina || CSS || EUN || align=right | 1.3 km || 
|-id=536 bgcolor=#E9E9E9
| 394536 ||  || — || October 9, 2007 || Kitt Peak || Spacewatch || — || align=right | 2.3 km || 
|-id=537 bgcolor=#E9E9E9
| 394537 ||  || — || October 10, 2007 || Mount Lemmon || Mount Lemmon Survey || — || align=right | 1.7 km || 
|-id=538 bgcolor=#E9E9E9
| 394538 ||  || — || October 9, 2007 || Kitt Peak || Spacewatch || — || align=right | 2.7 km || 
|-id=539 bgcolor=#E9E9E9
| 394539 ||  || — || October 16, 2007 || Bisei SG Center || BATTeRS || — || align=right data-sort-value="0.79" | 790 m || 
|-id=540 bgcolor=#fefefe
| 394540 ||  || — || October 16, 2007 || Catalina || CSS || H || align=right data-sort-value="0.91" | 910 m || 
|-id=541 bgcolor=#E9E9E9
| 394541 ||  || — || October 16, 2007 || Kitt Peak || Spacewatch || — || align=right | 1.2 km || 
|-id=542 bgcolor=#E9E9E9
| 394542 ||  || — || October 19, 2007 || Catalina || CSS || — || align=right | 1.8 km || 
|-id=543 bgcolor=#E9E9E9
| 394543 ||  || — || October 13, 2007 || Socorro || LINEAR || ADE || align=right | 1.8 km || 
|-id=544 bgcolor=#d6d6d6
| 394544 ||  || — || October 19, 2007 || Catalina || CSS || 3:2 || align=right | 5.5 km || 
|-id=545 bgcolor=#E9E9E9
| 394545 ||  || — || October 20, 2007 || Catalina || CSS || — || align=right data-sort-value="0.87" | 870 m || 
|-id=546 bgcolor=#E9E9E9
| 394546 ||  || — || October 20, 2007 || Mount Lemmon || Mount Lemmon Survey || — || align=right | 3.0 km || 
|-id=547 bgcolor=#E9E9E9
| 394547 ||  || — || October 24, 2007 || Mount Lemmon || Mount Lemmon Survey || — || align=right | 1.2 km || 
|-id=548 bgcolor=#E9E9E9
| 394548 ||  || — || October 30, 2007 || Mount Lemmon || Mount Lemmon Survey || KON || align=right | 2.4 km || 
|-id=549 bgcolor=#E9E9E9
| 394549 ||  || — || September 10, 2007 || Mount Lemmon || Mount Lemmon Survey || — || align=right | 1.3 km || 
|-id=550 bgcolor=#E9E9E9
| 394550 ||  || — || October 5, 2007 || Kitt Peak || Spacewatch || — || align=right | 1.3 km || 
|-id=551 bgcolor=#d6d6d6
| 394551 ||  || — || October 7, 2007 || Kitt Peak || Spacewatch || — || align=right | 2.1 km || 
|-id=552 bgcolor=#E9E9E9
| 394552 ||  || — || October 30, 2007 || Kitt Peak || Spacewatch || — || align=right | 1.4 km || 
|-id=553 bgcolor=#fefefe
| 394553 ||  || — || October 30, 2007 || Catalina || CSS || H || align=right data-sort-value="0.85" | 850 m || 
|-id=554 bgcolor=#E9E9E9
| 394554 ||  || — || October 30, 2007 || Kitt Peak || Spacewatch || MAR || align=right | 1.0 km || 
|-id=555 bgcolor=#E9E9E9
| 394555 ||  || — || October 30, 2007 || Kitt Peak || Spacewatch || — || align=right | 1.3 km || 
|-id=556 bgcolor=#E9E9E9
| 394556 ||  || — || October 12, 2007 || Kitt Peak || Spacewatch || — || align=right data-sort-value="0.86" | 860 m || 
|-id=557 bgcolor=#E9E9E9
| 394557 ||  || — || October 30, 2007 || Catalina || CSS || — || align=right | 1.5 km || 
|-id=558 bgcolor=#E9E9E9
| 394558 ||  || — || October 30, 2007 || Catalina || CSS || — || align=right | 1.3 km || 
|-id=559 bgcolor=#E9E9E9
| 394559 ||  || — || September 11, 2007 || Mount Lemmon || Mount Lemmon Survey || — || align=right | 1.7 km || 
|-id=560 bgcolor=#E9E9E9
| 394560 ||  || — || October 24, 2007 || Mount Lemmon || Mount Lemmon Survey || — || align=right | 2.0 km || 
|-id=561 bgcolor=#E9E9E9
| 394561 ||  || — || October 16, 2007 || Mount Lemmon || Mount Lemmon Survey || NEM || align=right | 2.6 km || 
|-id=562 bgcolor=#E9E9E9
| 394562 ||  || — || October 21, 2007 || Mount Lemmon || Mount Lemmon Survey || — || align=right | 1.8 km || 
|-id=563 bgcolor=#E9E9E9
| 394563 ||  || — || October 30, 2007 || Kitt Peak || Spacewatch || — || align=right | 1.8 km || 
|-id=564 bgcolor=#E9E9E9
| 394564 ||  || — || October 20, 2007 || Mount Lemmon || Mount Lemmon Survey || — || align=right | 1.6 km || 
|-id=565 bgcolor=#E9E9E9
| 394565 ||  || — || November 1, 2007 || Eskridge || G. Hug || — || align=right | 1.8 km || 
|-id=566 bgcolor=#E9E9E9
| 394566 ||  || — || November 6, 2007 || Eskridge || G. Hug || GEF || align=right | 1.3 km || 
|-id=567 bgcolor=#E9E9E9
| 394567 ||  || — || November 1, 2007 || Kitt Peak || Spacewatch || — || align=right | 1.9 km || 
|-id=568 bgcolor=#E9E9E9
| 394568 ||  || — || November 2, 2007 || Mount Lemmon || Mount Lemmon Survey || — || align=right | 2.1 km || 
|-id=569 bgcolor=#E9E9E9
| 394569 ||  || — || November 3, 2007 || 7300 || W. K. Y. Yeung || RAF || align=right | 1.2 km || 
|-id=570 bgcolor=#E9E9E9
| 394570 ||  || — || November 1, 2007 || Kitt Peak || Spacewatch || — || align=right | 2.5 km || 
|-id=571 bgcolor=#E9E9E9
| 394571 ||  || — || September 10, 2007 || Mount Lemmon || Mount Lemmon Survey || — || align=right data-sort-value="0.96" | 960 m || 
|-id=572 bgcolor=#E9E9E9
| 394572 ||  || — || November 1, 2007 || Kitt Peak || Spacewatch || — || align=right | 2.1 km || 
|-id=573 bgcolor=#E9E9E9
| 394573 ||  || — || October 20, 2007 || Mount Lemmon || Mount Lemmon Survey || MAR || align=right | 1.3 km || 
|-id=574 bgcolor=#E9E9E9
| 394574 ||  || — || November 1, 2007 || Kitt Peak || Spacewatch || HOF || align=right | 2.5 km || 
|-id=575 bgcolor=#E9E9E9
| 394575 ||  || — || November 1, 2007 || Kitt Peak || Spacewatch || — || align=right | 1.0 km || 
|-id=576 bgcolor=#d6d6d6
| 394576 ||  || — || November 1, 2007 || Kitt Peak || Spacewatch || — || align=right | 2.8 km || 
|-id=577 bgcolor=#E9E9E9
| 394577 ||  || — || October 16, 2007 || Mount Lemmon || Mount Lemmon Survey || — || align=right | 2.2 km || 
|-id=578 bgcolor=#E9E9E9
| 394578 ||  || — || September 13, 2007 || Mount Lemmon || Mount Lemmon Survey || — || align=right | 1.0 km || 
|-id=579 bgcolor=#E9E9E9
| 394579 ||  || — || September 10, 2007 || Mount Lemmon || Mount Lemmon Survey || — || align=right | 1.4 km || 
|-id=580 bgcolor=#E9E9E9
| 394580 ||  || — || October 8, 2007 || Mount Lemmon || Mount Lemmon Survey || — || align=right | 2.2 km || 
|-id=581 bgcolor=#E9E9E9
| 394581 ||  || — || September 18, 2007 || Mount Lemmon || Mount Lemmon Survey || — || align=right | 1.1 km || 
|-id=582 bgcolor=#E9E9E9
| 394582 ||  || — || May 20, 2006 || Kitt Peak || Spacewatch || — || align=right data-sort-value="0.87" | 870 m || 
|-id=583 bgcolor=#E9E9E9
| 394583 ||  || — || November 3, 2007 || Kitt Peak || Spacewatch || — || align=right | 1.5 km || 
|-id=584 bgcolor=#E9E9E9
| 394584 ||  || — || September 15, 2007 || Mount Lemmon || Mount Lemmon Survey || — || align=right | 2.4 km || 
|-id=585 bgcolor=#E9E9E9
| 394585 ||  || — || November 3, 2007 || Kitt Peak || Spacewatch || — || align=right | 1.1 km || 
|-id=586 bgcolor=#E9E9E9
| 394586 ||  || — || November 5, 2007 || Purple Mountain || PMO NEO || — || align=right | 2.4 km || 
|-id=587 bgcolor=#E9E9E9
| 394587 ||  || — || November 1, 2007 || Mount Lemmon || Mount Lemmon Survey || — || align=right data-sort-value="0.94" | 940 m || 
|-id=588 bgcolor=#E9E9E9
| 394588 ||  || — || October 12, 2007 || Mount Lemmon || Mount Lemmon Survey || MAR || align=right | 1.2 km || 
|-id=589 bgcolor=#E9E9E9
| 394589 ||  || — || November 4, 2007 || Kitt Peak || Spacewatch || (5) || align=right data-sort-value="0.79" | 790 m || 
|-id=590 bgcolor=#E9E9E9
| 394590 ||  || — || November 7, 2007 || Kitt Peak || Spacewatch || WIT || align=right | 1.0 km || 
|-id=591 bgcolor=#E9E9E9
| 394591 ||  || — || November 7, 2007 || Kitt Peak || Spacewatch || HOF || align=right | 2.3 km || 
|-id=592 bgcolor=#FA8072
| 394592 ||  || — || October 10, 2007 || Catalina || CSS || H || align=right data-sort-value="0.62" | 620 m || 
|-id=593 bgcolor=#E9E9E9
| 394593 ||  || — || November 14, 2007 || Bisei SG Center || BATTeRS || — || align=right | 1.4 km || 
|-id=594 bgcolor=#E9E9E9
| 394594 ||  || — || November 11, 2007 || Mount Lemmon || Mount Lemmon Survey || — || align=right | 2.4 km || 
|-id=595 bgcolor=#E9E9E9
| 394595 ||  || — || November 9, 2007 || Kitt Peak || Spacewatch || — || align=right | 1.7 km || 
|-id=596 bgcolor=#E9E9E9
| 394596 ||  || — || November 9, 2007 || Kitt Peak || Spacewatch || — || align=right | 2.1 km || 
|-id=597 bgcolor=#E9E9E9
| 394597 ||  || — || June 11, 2005 || Kitt Peak || Spacewatch || — || align=right | 2.8 km || 
|-id=598 bgcolor=#E9E9E9
| 394598 ||  || — || October 20, 2007 || Mount Lemmon || Mount Lemmon Survey || — || align=right | 2.5 km || 
|-id=599 bgcolor=#E9E9E9
| 394599 ||  || — || November 9, 2007 || Kitt Peak || Spacewatch || — || align=right | 1.4 km || 
|-id=600 bgcolor=#E9E9E9
| 394600 ||  || — || October 30, 2007 || Kitt Peak || Spacewatch || (5) || align=right | 1.0 km || 
|}

394601–394700 

|-bgcolor=#E9E9E9
| 394601 ||  || — || November 12, 2007 || Catalina || CSS || — || align=right | 2.9 km || 
|-id=602 bgcolor=#E9E9E9
| 394602 ||  || — || April 24, 1996 || Kitt Peak || Spacewatch || — || align=right | 2.5 km || 
|-id=603 bgcolor=#E9E9E9
| 394603 ||  || — || October 15, 2007 || Mount Lemmon || Mount Lemmon Survey || — || align=right | 2.1 km || 
|-id=604 bgcolor=#E9E9E9
| 394604 ||  || — || November 13, 2007 || Mount Lemmon || Mount Lemmon Survey || — || align=right | 1.9 km || 
|-id=605 bgcolor=#E9E9E9
| 394605 ||  || — || November 12, 2007 || Socorro || LINEAR || — || align=right | 2.4 km || 
|-id=606 bgcolor=#E9E9E9
| 394606 ||  || — || November 12, 2007 || Socorro || LINEAR || EUN || align=right | 2.1 km || 
|-id=607 bgcolor=#E9E9E9
| 394607 ||  || — || November 5, 2007 || Mount Lemmon || Mount Lemmon Survey || — || align=right | 2.7 km || 
|-id=608 bgcolor=#E9E9E9
| 394608 ||  || — || November 6, 2007 || XuYi || PMO NEO || — || align=right | 3.1 km || 
|-id=609 bgcolor=#E9E9E9
| 394609 ||  || — || November 5, 2007 || Kitt Peak || Spacewatch || NEM || align=right | 2.0 km || 
|-id=610 bgcolor=#E9E9E9
| 394610 ||  || — || November 15, 2007 || Catalina || CSS || — || align=right | 1.8 km || 
|-id=611 bgcolor=#E9E9E9
| 394611 ||  || — || November 5, 2007 || Mount Lemmon || Mount Lemmon Survey || — || align=right data-sort-value="0.83" | 830 m || 
|-id=612 bgcolor=#d6d6d6
| 394612 ||  || — || November 11, 2007 || Mount Lemmon || Mount Lemmon Survey || — || align=right | 2.5 km || 
|-id=613 bgcolor=#E9E9E9
| 394613 ||  || — || November 8, 2007 || Kitt Peak || Spacewatch || — || align=right | 2.4 km || 
|-id=614 bgcolor=#E9E9E9
| 394614 ||  || — || November 15, 2007 || Socorro || LINEAR || — || align=right | 2.5 km || 
|-id=615 bgcolor=#E9E9E9
| 394615 ||  || — || November 2, 2007 || Kitt Peak || Spacewatch || — || align=right | 1.1 km || 
|-id=616 bgcolor=#E9E9E9
| 394616 ||  || — || November 2, 2007 || Mount Lemmon || Mount Lemmon Survey || — || align=right | 2.8 km || 
|-id=617 bgcolor=#E9E9E9
| 394617 ||  || — || November 4, 2007 || Socorro || LINEAR || — || align=right | 2.8 km || 
|-id=618 bgcolor=#d6d6d6
| 394618 ||  || — || November 4, 2007 || Mount Lemmon || Mount Lemmon Survey || — || align=right | 2.3 km || 
|-id=619 bgcolor=#E9E9E9
| 394619 ||  || — || November 9, 2007 || Kitt Peak || Spacewatch || — || align=right | 1.1 km || 
|-id=620 bgcolor=#d6d6d6
| 394620 ||  || — || November 11, 2007 || Mount Lemmon || Mount Lemmon Survey || BRA || align=right | 1.8 km || 
|-id=621 bgcolor=#fefefe
| 394621 ||  || — || November 20, 2007 || Mount Lemmon || Mount Lemmon Survey || H || align=right data-sort-value="0.69" | 690 m || 
|-id=622 bgcolor=#d6d6d6
| 394622 ||  || — || November 2, 2007 || Mount Lemmon || Mount Lemmon Survey || — || align=right | 2.1 km || 
|-id=623 bgcolor=#d6d6d6
| 394623 ||  || — || November 20, 2007 || Mount Lemmon || Mount Lemmon Survey || — || align=right | 2.8 km || 
|-id=624 bgcolor=#E9E9E9
| 394624 ||  || — || November 19, 2007 || Kitt Peak || Spacewatch || AGN || align=right | 1.0 km || 
|-id=625 bgcolor=#E9E9E9
| 394625 ||  || — || November 19, 2007 || Mount Lemmon || Mount Lemmon Survey || — || align=right | 2.4 km || 
|-id=626 bgcolor=#E9E9E9
| 394626 ||  || — || November 8, 2007 || Kitt Peak || Spacewatch || — || align=right | 1.8 km || 
|-id=627 bgcolor=#E9E9E9
| 394627 ||  || — || October 20, 2007 || Mount Lemmon || Mount Lemmon Survey || — || align=right | 2.2 km || 
|-id=628 bgcolor=#E9E9E9
| 394628 ||  || — || December 4, 2007 || Kitt Peak || Spacewatch || — || align=right | 2.1 km || 
|-id=629 bgcolor=#E9E9E9
| 394629 ||  || — || November 18, 2007 || Kitt Peak || Spacewatch || NEM || align=right | 2.1 km || 
|-id=630 bgcolor=#E9E9E9
| 394630 ||  || — || December 15, 2007 || Kitt Peak || Spacewatch || AGN || align=right | 1.2 km || 
|-id=631 bgcolor=#E9E9E9
| 394631 ||  || — || November 12, 2007 || Socorro || LINEAR || — || align=right | 3.2 km || 
|-id=632 bgcolor=#E9E9E9
| 394632 ||  || — || November 9, 2007 || Kitt Peak || Spacewatch || — || align=right | 1.5 km || 
|-id=633 bgcolor=#E9E9E9
| 394633 ||  || — || December 4, 2007 || Kitt Peak || Spacewatch || — || align=right | 2.1 km || 
|-id=634 bgcolor=#E9E9E9
| 394634 ||  || — || December 5, 2007 || Kitt Peak || Spacewatch || GEF || align=right | 1.4 km || 
|-id=635 bgcolor=#E9E9E9
| 394635 ||  || — || November 13, 2007 || Kitt Peak || Spacewatch || — || align=right | 1.4 km || 
|-id=636 bgcolor=#d6d6d6
| 394636 ||  || — || November 12, 2007 || Mount Lemmon || Mount Lemmon Survey || — || align=right | 2.8 km || 
|-id=637 bgcolor=#E9E9E9
| 394637 ||  || — || December 16, 2007 || Kitt Peak || Spacewatch || (5) || align=right | 1.1 km || 
|-id=638 bgcolor=#d6d6d6
| 394638 ||  || — || December 17, 2007 || Mount Lemmon || Mount Lemmon Survey || — || align=right | 2.5 km || 
|-id=639 bgcolor=#E9E9E9
| 394639 ||  || — || November 13, 2007 || Kitt Peak || Spacewatch || NEM || align=right | 2.7 km || 
|-id=640 bgcolor=#d6d6d6
| 394640 ||  || — || December 30, 2007 || Mount Lemmon || Mount Lemmon Survey || — || align=right | 2.4 km || 
|-id=641 bgcolor=#E9E9E9
| 394641 ||  || — || December 30, 2007 || Mount Lemmon || Mount Lemmon Survey || — || align=right | 2.5 km || 
|-id=642 bgcolor=#E9E9E9
| 394642 ||  || — || December 15, 2007 || Catalina || CSS || — || align=right | 2.1 km || 
|-id=643 bgcolor=#d6d6d6
| 394643 ||  || — || December 31, 2007 || Mount Lemmon || Mount Lemmon Survey || — || align=right | 2.4 km || 
|-id=644 bgcolor=#E9E9E9
| 394644 ||  || — || November 5, 2007 || Kitt Peak || Spacewatch || — || align=right | 2.3 km || 
|-id=645 bgcolor=#d6d6d6
| 394645 ||  || — || December 18, 2007 || Mount Lemmon || Mount Lemmon Survey || — || align=right | 2.5 km || 
|-id=646 bgcolor=#d6d6d6
| 394646 ||  || — || December 20, 2007 || Kitt Peak || Spacewatch || — || align=right | 2.5 km || 
|-id=647 bgcolor=#d6d6d6
| 394647 ||  || — || December 30, 2007 || Kitt Peak || Spacewatch || — || align=right | 2.0 km || 
|-id=648 bgcolor=#d6d6d6
| 394648 ||  || — || December 31, 2007 || Mount Lemmon || Mount Lemmon Survey || — || align=right | 2.4 km || 
|-id=649 bgcolor=#d6d6d6
| 394649 ||  || — || January 11, 2008 || Kitt Peak || Spacewatch || — || align=right | 2.9 km || 
|-id=650 bgcolor=#d6d6d6
| 394650 ||  || — || January 11, 2008 || Mount Lemmon || Mount Lemmon Survey || EMA || align=right | 3.4 km || 
|-id=651 bgcolor=#d6d6d6
| 394651 ||  || — || January 12, 2008 || Kitt Peak || Spacewatch || — || align=right | 3.0 km || 
|-id=652 bgcolor=#d6d6d6
| 394652 ||  || — || January 14, 2008 || Kitt Peak || Spacewatch || — || align=right | 2.1 km || 
|-id=653 bgcolor=#d6d6d6
| 394653 ||  || — || January 13, 2008 || Kitt Peak || Spacewatch || TEL || align=right | 1.2 km || 
|-id=654 bgcolor=#d6d6d6
| 394654 ||  || — || January 6, 2008 || Mauna Kea || P. A. Wiegert || — || align=right | 2.2 km || 
|-id=655 bgcolor=#d6d6d6
| 394655 ||  || — || January 15, 2008 || Mount Lemmon || Mount Lemmon Survey || — || align=right | 2.2 km || 
|-id=656 bgcolor=#E9E9E9
| 394656 ||  || — || January 16, 2008 || Kitt Peak || Spacewatch || — || align=right | 2.4 km || 
|-id=657 bgcolor=#d6d6d6
| 394657 ||  || — || January 18, 2008 || Kitt Peak || Spacewatch || — || align=right | 2.4 km || 
|-id=658 bgcolor=#d6d6d6
| 394658 ||  || — || January 20, 2008 || Mount Lemmon || Mount Lemmon Survey || EOS || align=right | 2.0 km || 
|-id=659 bgcolor=#d6d6d6
| 394659 ||  || — || January 30, 2008 || Catalina || CSS || — || align=right | 2.8 km || 
|-id=660 bgcolor=#d6d6d6
| 394660 ||  || — || January 31, 2008 || Mount Lemmon || Mount Lemmon Survey || — || align=right | 2.1 km || 
|-id=661 bgcolor=#d6d6d6
| 394661 ||  || — || February 3, 2008 || Kitt Peak || Spacewatch || — || align=right | 4.0 km || 
|-id=662 bgcolor=#d6d6d6
| 394662 ||  || — || February 3, 2008 || Kitt Peak || Spacewatch || — || align=right | 2.4 km || 
|-id=663 bgcolor=#d6d6d6
| 394663 ||  || — || January 30, 2008 || Kitt Peak || Spacewatch || — || align=right | 2.8 km || 
|-id=664 bgcolor=#d6d6d6
| 394664 ||  || — || February 3, 2008 || Kitt Peak || Spacewatch || — || align=right | 2.8 km || 
|-id=665 bgcolor=#d6d6d6
| 394665 ||  || — || February 3, 2008 || Kitt Peak || Spacewatch || — || align=right | 2.8 km || 
|-id=666 bgcolor=#d6d6d6
| 394666 ||  || — || February 1, 2008 || Kitt Peak || Spacewatch || EOS || align=right | 1.8 km || 
|-id=667 bgcolor=#d6d6d6
| 394667 ||  || — || February 2, 2008 || Kitt Peak || Spacewatch || BRA || align=right | 1.7 km || 
|-id=668 bgcolor=#d6d6d6
| 394668 ||  || — || February 2, 2008 || Kitt Peak || Spacewatch || — || align=right | 2.1 km || 
|-id=669 bgcolor=#d6d6d6
| 394669 ||  || — || February 2, 2008 || Kitt Peak || Spacewatch || THM || align=right | 2.3 km || 
|-id=670 bgcolor=#d6d6d6
| 394670 ||  || — || February 2, 2008 || Kitt Peak || Spacewatch || — || align=right | 2.1 km || 
|-id=671 bgcolor=#d6d6d6
| 394671 ||  || — || February 2, 2008 || Kitt Peak || Spacewatch || — || align=right | 2.3 km || 
|-id=672 bgcolor=#d6d6d6
| 394672 ||  || — || February 2, 2008 || Kitt Peak || Spacewatch || — || align=right | 3.3 km || 
|-id=673 bgcolor=#d6d6d6
| 394673 ||  || — || February 2, 2008 || Kitt Peak || Spacewatch || — || align=right | 2.4 km || 
|-id=674 bgcolor=#d6d6d6
| 394674 ||  || — || January 1, 2008 || Mount Lemmon || Mount Lemmon Survey || — || align=right | 2.4 km || 
|-id=675 bgcolor=#d6d6d6
| 394675 ||  || — || February 10, 2008 || Junk Bond || D. Healy || — || align=right | 4.2 km || 
|-id=676 bgcolor=#d6d6d6
| 394676 ||  || — || February 7, 2008 || Kitt Peak || Spacewatch || — || align=right | 2.2 km || 
|-id=677 bgcolor=#d6d6d6
| 394677 ||  || — || February 7, 2008 || Kitt Peak || Spacewatch || — || align=right | 3.0 km || 
|-id=678 bgcolor=#d6d6d6
| 394678 ||  || — || February 7, 2008 || Mount Lemmon || Mount Lemmon Survey || — || align=right | 2.3 km || 
|-id=679 bgcolor=#d6d6d6
| 394679 ||  || — || October 27, 2006 || Catalina || CSS || — || align=right | 2.7 km || 
|-id=680 bgcolor=#d6d6d6
| 394680 ||  || — || February 9, 2008 || Kitt Peak || Spacewatch || — || align=right | 2.3 km || 
|-id=681 bgcolor=#d6d6d6
| 394681 ||  || — || February 9, 2008 || Kitt Peak || Spacewatch || — || align=right | 2.7 km || 
|-id=682 bgcolor=#d6d6d6
| 394682 ||  || — || February 8, 2008 || Kitt Peak || Spacewatch || — || align=right | 2.6 km || 
|-id=683 bgcolor=#d6d6d6
| 394683 ||  || — || February 8, 2008 || Kitt Peak || Spacewatch || EOS || align=right | 2.2 km || 
|-id=684 bgcolor=#d6d6d6
| 394684 ||  || — || February 8, 2008 || Kitt Peak || Spacewatch || — || align=right | 3.4 km || 
|-id=685 bgcolor=#d6d6d6
| 394685 ||  || — || February 8, 2008 || Mount Lemmon || Mount Lemmon Survey || EOS || align=right | 1.6 km || 
|-id=686 bgcolor=#d6d6d6
| 394686 ||  || — || February 8, 2008 || Kitt Peak || Spacewatch || — || align=right | 3.0 km || 
|-id=687 bgcolor=#d6d6d6
| 394687 ||  || — || February 9, 2008 || Kitt Peak || Spacewatch || — || align=right | 2.6 km || 
|-id=688 bgcolor=#d6d6d6
| 394688 ||  || — || February 9, 2008 || Kitt Peak || Spacewatch || — || align=right | 2.6 km || 
|-id=689 bgcolor=#d6d6d6
| 394689 ||  || — || February 9, 2008 || Kitt Peak || Spacewatch || — || align=right | 2.3 km || 
|-id=690 bgcolor=#E9E9E9
| 394690 ||  || — || February 11, 2008 || Mount Lemmon || Mount Lemmon Survey || — || align=right | 2.6 km || 
|-id=691 bgcolor=#d6d6d6
| 394691 ||  || — || February 13, 2008 || Mount Lemmon || Mount Lemmon Survey || — || align=right | 2.9 km || 
|-id=692 bgcolor=#d6d6d6
| 394692 ||  || — || February 12, 2008 || Mount Lemmon || Mount Lemmon Survey || EOS || align=right | 1.8 km || 
|-id=693 bgcolor=#d6d6d6
| 394693 ||  || — || February 13, 2008 || Mount Lemmon || Mount Lemmon Survey || VER || align=right | 3.3 km || 
|-id=694 bgcolor=#E9E9E9
| 394694 ||  || — || December 11, 2002 || Socorro || LINEAR || — || align=right | 2.8 km || 
|-id=695 bgcolor=#d6d6d6
| 394695 ||  || — || February 2, 2008 || Kitt Peak || Spacewatch || — || align=right | 2.7 km || 
|-id=696 bgcolor=#d6d6d6
| 394696 ||  || — || February 10, 2008 || Kitt Peak || Spacewatch || — || align=right | 2.5 km || 
|-id=697 bgcolor=#d6d6d6
| 394697 ||  || — || February 13, 2008 || Mount Lemmon || Mount Lemmon Survey || — || align=right | 2.8 km || 
|-id=698 bgcolor=#d6d6d6
| 394698 ||  || — || February 1, 2008 || Kitt Peak || Spacewatch || — || align=right | 2.1 km || 
|-id=699 bgcolor=#d6d6d6
| 394699 ||  || — || February 13, 2008 || Mount Lemmon || Mount Lemmon Survey || THM || align=right | 2.2 km || 
|-id=700 bgcolor=#d6d6d6
| 394700 ||  || — || February 7, 2008 || Mount Lemmon || Mount Lemmon Survey || EOS || align=right | 1.8 km || 
|}

394701–394800 

|-bgcolor=#d6d6d6
| 394701 ||  || — || February 9, 2008 || Mount Lemmon || Mount Lemmon Survey || HYG || align=right | 2.4 km || 
|-id=702 bgcolor=#d6d6d6
| 394702 ||  || — || January 11, 2008 || Kitt Peak || Spacewatch || — || align=right | 2.5 km || 
|-id=703 bgcolor=#E9E9E9
| 394703 ||  || — || February 27, 2008 || Mount Lemmon || Mount Lemmon Survey || — || align=right | 2.9 km || 
|-id=704 bgcolor=#d6d6d6
| 394704 ||  || — || February 28, 2008 || Mount Lemmon || Mount Lemmon Survey || — || align=right | 2.3 km || 
|-id=705 bgcolor=#d6d6d6
| 394705 ||  || — || February 24, 2008 || Kitt Peak || Spacewatch || — || align=right | 3.0 km || 
|-id=706 bgcolor=#d6d6d6
| 394706 ||  || — || February 29, 2008 || Mount Lemmon || Mount Lemmon Survey || — || align=right | 3.7 km || 
|-id=707 bgcolor=#d6d6d6
| 394707 ||  || — || February 10, 2008 || Mount Lemmon || Mount Lemmon Survey || — || align=right | 2.3 km || 
|-id=708 bgcolor=#d6d6d6
| 394708 ||  || — || February 29, 2008 || Mount Lemmon || Mount Lemmon Survey || — || align=right | 3.5 km || 
|-id=709 bgcolor=#d6d6d6
| 394709 ||  || — || December 5, 2007 || Kitt Peak || Spacewatch || — || align=right | 2.6 km || 
|-id=710 bgcolor=#d6d6d6
| 394710 ||  || — || February 27, 2008 || Mount Lemmon || Mount Lemmon Survey || — || align=right | 2.6 km || 
|-id=711 bgcolor=#d6d6d6
| 394711 ||  || — || February 28, 2008 || Mount Lemmon || Mount Lemmon Survey || THM || align=right | 2.4 km || 
|-id=712 bgcolor=#d6d6d6
| 394712 ||  || — || February 10, 2008 || Kitt Peak || Spacewatch || — || align=right | 3.0 km || 
|-id=713 bgcolor=#d6d6d6
| 394713 ||  || — || March 1, 2008 || Mount Lemmon || Mount Lemmon Survey || — || align=right | 3.0 km || 
|-id=714 bgcolor=#d6d6d6
| 394714 ||  || — || March 4, 2008 || Kitt Peak || Spacewatch || — || align=right | 2.7 km || 
|-id=715 bgcolor=#d6d6d6
| 394715 ||  || — || March 5, 2008 || Kitt Peak || Spacewatch || — || align=right | 2.7 km || 
|-id=716 bgcolor=#d6d6d6
| 394716 ||  || — || March 9, 2008 || Mount Lemmon || Mount Lemmon Survey || TIR || align=right | 2.6 km || 
|-id=717 bgcolor=#d6d6d6
| 394717 ||  || — || December 20, 2007 || Mount Lemmon || Mount Lemmon Survey || — || align=right | 3.2 km || 
|-id=718 bgcolor=#d6d6d6
| 394718 ||  || — || March 7, 2008 || Catalina || CSS || — || align=right | 3.8 km || 
|-id=719 bgcolor=#d6d6d6
| 394719 ||  || — || March 7, 2008 || Catalina || CSS || — || align=right | 3.8 km || 
|-id=720 bgcolor=#d6d6d6
| 394720 ||  || — || February 11, 2008 || Mount Lemmon || Mount Lemmon Survey || EOS || align=right | 1.9 km || 
|-id=721 bgcolor=#d6d6d6
| 394721 ||  || — || February 13, 2008 || Kitt Peak || Spacewatch || — || align=right | 2.6 km || 
|-id=722 bgcolor=#d6d6d6
| 394722 ||  || — || January 11, 2008 || Mount Lemmon || Mount Lemmon Survey || EOS || align=right | 1.8 km || 
|-id=723 bgcolor=#d6d6d6
| 394723 ||  || — || February 12, 2008 || Kitt Peak || Spacewatch || — || align=right | 2.6 km || 
|-id=724 bgcolor=#d6d6d6
| 394724 ||  || — || March 8, 2008 || Kitt Peak || Spacewatch || — || align=right | 2.3 km || 
|-id=725 bgcolor=#d6d6d6
| 394725 ||  || — || February 26, 2008 || Mount Lemmon || Mount Lemmon Survey || — || align=right | 3.1 km || 
|-id=726 bgcolor=#d6d6d6
| 394726 ||  || — || March 10, 2008 || Kitt Peak || Spacewatch || — || align=right | 3.2 km || 
|-id=727 bgcolor=#d6d6d6
| 394727 ||  || — || March 11, 2008 || Kitt Peak || Spacewatch || — || align=right | 4.1 km || 
|-id=728 bgcolor=#d6d6d6
| 394728 ||  || — || October 1, 2005 || Mount Lemmon || Mount Lemmon Survey || — || align=right | 2.7 km || 
|-id=729 bgcolor=#d6d6d6
| 394729 ||  || — || March 11, 2008 || Kitt Peak || Spacewatch || THM || align=right | 1.9 km || 
|-id=730 bgcolor=#d6d6d6
| 394730 ||  || — || February 7, 2008 || Mount Lemmon || Mount Lemmon Survey || EOS || align=right | 2.2 km || 
|-id=731 bgcolor=#d6d6d6
| 394731 ||  || — || March 10, 2008 || Kitt Peak || Spacewatch || — || align=right | 2.3 km || 
|-id=732 bgcolor=#d6d6d6
| 394732 ||  || — || March 10, 2008 || Mount Lemmon || Mount Lemmon Survey || — || align=right | 2.8 km || 
|-id=733 bgcolor=#d6d6d6
| 394733 ||  || — || March 11, 2008 || Mount Lemmon || Mount Lemmon Survey || LIX || align=right | 4.2 km || 
|-id=734 bgcolor=#d6d6d6
| 394734 ||  || — || March 11, 2008 || Mount Lemmon || Mount Lemmon Survey || VER || align=right | 2.8 km || 
|-id=735 bgcolor=#d6d6d6
| 394735 ||  || — || March 15, 2008 || Kitt Peak || Spacewatch || — || align=right | 2.6 km || 
|-id=736 bgcolor=#d6d6d6
| 394736 ||  || — || March 6, 2008 || Mount Lemmon || Mount Lemmon Survey || — || align=right | 3.3 km || 
|-id=737 bgcolor=#d6d6d6
| 394737 ||  || — || March 11, 2008 || Kitt Peak || Spacewatch || — || align=right | 2.9 km || 
|-id=738 bgcolor=#d6d6d6
| 394738 ||  || — || March 13, 2008 || Catalina || CSS || — || align=right | 5.4 km || 
|-id=739 bgcolor=#d6d6d6
| 394739 ||  || — || March 5, 2008 || Kitt Peak || Spacewatch || — || align=right | 2.4 km || 
|-id=740 bgcolor=#d6d6d6
| 394740 ||  || — || March 27, 2008 || Kitt Peak || Spacewatch || VER || align=right | 4.1 km || 
|-id=741 bgcolor=#d6d6d6
| 394741 ||  || — || February 10, 2008 || Kitt Peak || Spacewatch || — || align=right | 2.3 km || 
|-id=742 bgcolor=#d6d6d6
| 394742 ||  || — || March 5, 2008 || Mount Lemmon || Mount Lemmon Survey || — || align=right | 3.0 km || 
|-id=743 bgcolor=#d6d6d6
| 394743 ||  || — || March 28, 2008 || Mount Lemmon || Mount Lemmon Survey || HYG || align=right | 2.3 km || 
|-id=744 bgcolor=#d6d6d6
| 394744 ||  || — || March 28, 2008 || Mount Lemmon || Mount Lemmon Survey || — || align=right | 2.8 km || 
|-id=745 bgcolor=#d6d6d6
| 394745 ||  || — || February 9, 2008 || Kitt Peak || Spacewatch || — || align=right | 2.6 km || 
|-id=746 bgcolor=#d6d6d6
| 394746 ||  || — || February 28, 2008 || Mount Lemmon || Mount Lemmon Survey || — || align=right | 2.8 km || 
|-id=747 bgcolor=#d6d6d6
| 394747 ||  || — || March 28, 2008 || Mount Lemmon || Mount Lemmon Survey || — || align=right | 3.2 km || 
|-id=748 bgcolor=#d6d6d6
| 394748 ||  || — || March 28, 2008 || Kitt Peak || Spacewatch || — || align=right | 3.1 km || 
|-id=749 bgcolor=#d6d6d6
| 394749 ||  || — || March 10, 2008 || Kitt Peak || Spacewatch || — || align=right | 2.9 km || 
|-id=750 bgcolor=#d6d6d6
| 394750 ||  || — || March 28, 2008 || Mount Lemmon || Mount Lemmon Survey || — || align=right | 2.1 km || 
|-id=751 bgcolor=#d6d6d6
| 394751 ||  || — || March 28, 2008 || Mount Lemmon || Mount Lemmon Survey || — || align=right | 2.7 km || 
|-id=752 bgcolor=#d6d6d6
| 394752 ||  || — || October 1, 2005 || Kitt Peak || Spacewatch || EOS || align=right | 1.9 km || 
|-id=753 bgcolor=#d6d6d6
| 394753 ||  || — || March 30, 2008 || Kitt Peak || Spacewatch || HYG || align=right | 2.7 km || 
|-id=754 bgcolor=#d6d6d6
| 394754 ||  || — || February 26, 2008 || Mount Lemmon || Mount Lemmon Survey || LIX || align=right | 3.0 km || 
|-id=755 bgcolor=#d6d6d6
| 394755 ||  || — || March 31, 2008 || Kitt Peak || Spacewatch || — || align=right | 2.8 km || 
|-id=756 bgcolor=#d6d6d6
| 394756 ||  || — || March 31, 2008 || Mount Lemmon || Mount Lemmon Survey || — || align=right | 3.0 km || 
|-id=757 bgcolor=#d6d6d6
| 394757 ||  || — || March 28, 2008 || Mount Lemmon || Mount Lemmon Survey || VER || align=right | 2.7 km || 
|-id=758 bgcolor=#d6d6d6
| 394758 ||  || — || March 28, 2008 || Mount Lemmon || Mount Lemmon Survey || — || align=right | 2.6 km || 
|-id=759 bgcolor=#d6d6d6
| 394759 ||  || — || March 29, 2008 || Mount Lemmon || Mount Lemmon Survey || — || align=right | 4.5 km || 
|-id=760 bgcolor=#d6d6d6
| 394760 ||  || — || April 4, 2008 || Kitt Peak || Spacewatch || — || align=right | 2.9 km || 
|-id=761 bgcolor=#d6d6d6
| 394761 ||  || — || April 4, 2008 || Kitt Peak || Spacewatch || — || align=right | 2.8 km || 
|-id=762 bgcolor=#d6d6d6
| 394762 ||  || — || April 1, 2008 || Mount Lemmon || Mount Lemmon Survey || — || align=right | 2.4 km || 
|-id=763 bgcolor=#d6d6d6
| 394763 ||  || — || April 1, 2008 || Mount Lemmon || Mount Lemmon Survey || — || align=right | 3.2 km || 
|-id=764 bgcolor=#d6d6d6
| 394764 ||  || — || April 3, 2008 || Kitt Peak || Spacewatch || — || align=right | 2.4 km || 
|-id=765 bgcolor=#d6d6d6
| 394765 ||  || — || February 9, 2008 || Kitt Peak || Spacewatch || — || align=right | 2.9 km || 
|-id=766 bgcolor=#d6d6d6
| 394766 ||  || — || March 13, 2008 || Kitt Peak || Spacewatch || THM || align=right | 2.1 km || 
|-id=767 bgcolor=#d6d6d6
| 394767 ||  || — || April 3, 2008 || Mount Lemmon || Mount Lemmon Survey || THM || align=right | 2.1 km || 
|-id=768 bgcolor=#d6d6d6
| 394768 ||  || — || March 26, 2008 || Kitt Peak || Spacewatch || — || align=right | 3.5 km || 
|-id=769 bgcolor=#d6d6d6
| 394769 ||  || — || April 3, 2008 || Kitt Peak || Spacewatch || — || align=right | 3.8 km || 
|-id=770 bgcolor=#d6d6d6
| 394770 ||  || — || April 3, 2008 || Mount Lemmon || Mount Lemmon Survey || — || align=right | 2.8 km || 
|-id=771 bgcolor=#d6d6d6
| 394771 ||  || — || March 2, 2008 || XuYi || PMO NEO || — || align=right | 3.2 km || 
|-id=772 bgcolor=#d6d6d6
| 394772 ||  || — || April 5, 2008 || Mount Lemmon || Mount Lemmon Survey || — || align=right | 3.0 km || 
|-id=773 bgcolor=#d6d6d6
| 394773 ||  || — || April 5, 2008 || Mount Lemmon || Mount Lemmon Survey || — || align=right | 2.7 km || 
|-id=774 bgcolor=#d6d6d6
| 394774 ||  || — || March 27, 2008 || Kitt Peak || Spacewatch || Tj (2.99) || align=right | 3.9 km || 
|-id=775 bgcolor=#d6d6d6
| 394775 ||  || — || April 8, 2008 || Kitt Peak || Spacewatch || — || align=right | 3.0 km || 
|-id=776 bgcolor=#d6d6d6
| 394776 ||  || — || March 12, 2008 || Mount Lemmon || Mount Lemmon Survey || — || align=right | 2.7 km || 
|-id=777 bgcolor=#d6d6d6
| 394777 ||  || — || March 27, 2008 || Mount Lemmon || Mount Lemmon Survey || THM || align=right | 1.8 km || 
|-id=778 bgcolor=#d6d6d6
| 394778 ||  || — || March 5, 2008 || Mount Lemmon || Mount Lemmon Survey || — || align=right | 2.6 km || 
|-id=779 bgcolor=#d6d6d6
| 394779 ||  || — || April 12, 2008 || Catalina || CSS || — || align=right | 3.6 km || 
|-id=780 bgcolor=#d6d6d6
| 394780 ||  || — || April 10, 2008 || Catalina || CSS || — || align=right | 3.5 km || 
|-id=781 bgcolor=#d6d6d6
| 394781 ||  || — || April 6, 2008 || Mount Lemmon || Mount Lemmon Survey || — || align=right | 4.5 km || 
|-id=782 bgcolor=#d6d6d6
| 394782 ||  || — || April 6, 2008 || Catalina || CSS || — || align=right | 5.1 km || 
|-id=783 bgcolor=#FFC2E0
| 394783 ||  || — || April 28, 2008 || Kitt Peak || Spacewatch || APO || align=right data-sort-value="0.40" | 400 m || 
|-id=784 bgcolor=#d6d6d6
| 394784 ||  || — || April 25, 2008 || Kitt Peak || Spacewatch || — || align=right | 2.8 km || 
|-id=785 bgcolor=#d6d6d6
| 394785 ||  || — || January 17, 2007 || Kitt Peak || Spacewatch || 7:4 || align=right | 3.6 km || 
|-id=786 bgcolor=#d6d6d6
| 394786 ||  || — || April 13, 2008 || Mount Lemmon || Mount Lemmon Survey || — || align=right | 2.7 km || 
|-id=787 bgcolor=#d6d6d6
| 394787 ||  || — || April 26, 2008 || Mount Lemmon || Mount Lemmon Survey || 7:4 || align=right | 4.2 km || 
|-id=788 bgcolor=#fefefe
| 394788 ||  || — || April 29, 2008 || Kitt Peak || Spacewatch || — || align=right data-sort-value="0.55" | 550 m || 
|-id=789 bgcolor=#d6d6d6
| 394789 ||  || — || April 30, 2008 || Kitt Peak || Spacewatch || — || align=right | 4.1 km || 
|-id=790 bgcolor=#d6d6d6
| 394790 ||  || — || December 30, 2000 || Socorro || LINEAR || Tj (2.99) || align=right | 4.9 km || 
|-id=791 bgcolor=#d6d6d6
| 394791 ||  || — || May 5, 2008 || Kitt Peak || Spacewatch || EOS || align=right | 1.9 km || 
|-id=792 bgcolor=#fefefe
| 394792 || 2008 PR || — || August 1, 2008 || Dauban || F. Kugel || — || align=right data-sort-value="0.70" | 700 m || 
|-id=793 bgcolor=#fefefe
| 394793 ||  || — || August 6, 2008 || Siding Spring || SSS || — || align=right data-sort-value="0.76" | 760 m || 
|-id=794 bgcolor=#FA8072
| 394794 ||  || — || August 26, 2008 || Farra d'Isonzo || Farra d'Isonzo || — || align=right data-sort-value="0.86" | 860 m || 
|-id=795 bgcolor=#fefefe
| 394795 ||  || — || August 23, 2008 || Kitt Peak || Spacewatch || — || align=right data-sort-value="0.70" | 700 m || 
|-id=796 bgcolor=#fefefe
| 394796 ||  || — || August 24, 2008 || Kitt Peak || Spacewatch || — || align=right data-sort-value="0.72" | 720 m || 
|-id=797 bgcolor=#fefefe
| 394797 ||  || — || August 30, 2008 || Socorro || LINEAR || — || align=right data-sort-value="0.98" | 980 m || 
|-id=798 bgcolor=#C2FFFF
| 394798 ||  || — || September 3, 2008 || Kitt Peak || Spacewatch || L4 || align=right | 8.0 km || 
|-id=799 bgcolor=#fefefe
| 394799 ||  || — || September 3, 2008 || Kitt Peak || Spacewatch || — || align=right data-sort-value="0.82" | 820 m || 
|-id=800 bgcolor=#E9E9E9
| 394800 ||  || — || September 8, 2008 || Altschwendt || W. Ries || — || align=right | 1.5 km || 
|}

394801–394900 

|-bgcolor=#fefefe
| 394801 ||  || — || September 2, 2008 || Kitt Peak || Spacewatch || — || align=right data-sort-value="0.71" | 710 m || 
|-id=802 bgcolor=#fefefe
| 394802 ||  || — || September 3, 2008 || Kitt Peak || Spacewatch || — || align=right | 1.2 km || 
|-id=803 bgcolor=#fefefe
| 394803 ||  || — || September 3, 2008 || Kitt Peak || Spacewatch || — || align=right data-sort-value="0.74" | 740 m || 
|-id=804 bgcolor=#FA8072
| 394804 ||  || — || September 4, 2008 || Kitt Peak || Spacewatch || — || align=right data-sort-value="0.66" | 660 m || 
|-id=805 bgcolor=#fefefe
| 394805 ||  || — || September 6, 2008 || Andrushivka || Andrushivka Obs. || — || align=right data-sort-value="0.73" | 730 m || 
|-id=806 bgcolor=#fefefe
| 394806 ||  || — || September 7, 2008 || Mount Lemmon || Mount Lemmon Survey || — || align=right data-sort-value="0.82" | 820 m || 
|-id=807 bgcolor=#fefefe
| 394807 ||  || — || September 7, 2008 || Catalina || CSS || — || align=right data-sort-value="0.88" | 880 m || 
|-id=808 bgcolor=#C2FFFF
| 394808 ||  || — || September 6, 2008 || Kitt Peak || Spacewatch || L4ARK || align=right | 7.0 km || 
|-id=809 bgcolor=#fefefe
| 394809 ||  || — || September 5, 2008 || Kitt Peak || Spacewatch || — || align=right data-sort-value="0.97" | 970 m || 
|-id=810 bgcolor=#fefefe
| 394810 ||  || — || September 4, 2008 || Kitt Peak || Spacewatch || — || align=right data-sort-value="0.71" | 710 m || 
|-id=811 bgcolor=#fefefe
| 394811 ||  || — || September 5, 2008 || Socorro || LINEAR || — || align=right data-sort-value="0.96" | 960 m || 
|-id=812 bgcolor=#fefefe
| 394812 ||  || — || September 22, 2008 || Socorro || LINEAR || — || align=right | 1.1 km || 
|-id=813 bgcolor=#fefefe
| 394813 ||  || — || September 19, 2008 || Kitt Peak || Spacewatch || — || align=right data-sort-value="0.87" | 870 m || 
|-id=814 bgcolor=#fefefe
| 394814 ||  || — || September 19, 2008 || Kitt Peak || Spacewatch || — || align=right data-sort-value="0.80" | 800 m || 
|-id=815 bgcolor=#fefefe
| 394815 ||  || — || September 19, 2008 || Kitt Peak || Spacewatch || — || align=right data-sort-value="0.78" | 780 m || 
|-id=816 bgcolor=#fefefe
| 394816 ||  || — || January 17, 2007 || Kitt Peak || Spacewatch || — || align=right data-sort-value="0.65" | 650 m || 
|-id=817 bgcolor=#fefefe
| 394817 ||  || — || September 20, 2008 || Kitt Peak || Spacewatch || V || align=right data-sort-value="0.72" | 720 m || 
|-id=818 bgcolor=#fefefe
| 394818 ||  || — || September 20, 2008 || Kitt Peak || Spacewatch || NYS || align=right data-sort-value="0.47" | 470 m || 
|-id=819 bgcolor=#fefefe
| 394819 ||  || — || September 3, 2008 || Kitt Peak || Spacewatch || V || align=right data-sort-value="0.62" | 620 m || 
|-id=820 bgcolor=#fefefe
| 394820 ||  || — || September 20, 2008 || Kitt Peak || Spacewatch || V || align=right data-sort-value="0.58" | 580 m || 
|-id=821 bgcolor=#C2FFFF
| 394821 ||  || — || September 23, 2008 || Kitt Peak || Spacewatch || L4 || align=right | 10 km || 
|-id=822 bgcolor=#fefefe
| 394822 ||  || — || September 20, 2008 || Kitt Peak || Spacewatch || — || align=right data-sort-value="0.72" | 720 m || 
|-id=823 bgcolor=#FA8072
| 394823 ||  || — || September 22, 2008 || Kitt Peak || Spacewatch || — || align=right data-sort-value="0.71" | 710 m || 
|-id=824 bgcolor=#fefefe
| 394824 ||  || — || September 6, 2008 || Catalina || CSS || — || align=right data-sort-value="0.92" | 920 m || 
|-id=825 bgcolor=#E9E9E9
| 394825 ||  || — || September 22, 2008 || Kitt Peak || Spacewatch || critical || align=right data-sort-value="0.82" | 820 m || 
|-id=826 bgcolor=#fefefe
| 394826 ||  || — || September 23, 2008 || Kitt Peak || Spacewatch || — || align=right data-sort-value="0.78" | 780 m || 
|-id=827 bgcolor=#fefefe
| 394827 ||  || — || September 23, 2008 || Siding Spring || SSS || (2076) || align=right data-sort-value="0.83" | 830 m || 
|-id=828 bgcolor=#fefefe
| 394828 ||  || — || December 8, 2005 || Kitt Peak || Spacewatch || — || align=right data-sort-value="0.77" | 770 m || 
|-id=829 bgcolor=#fefefe
| 394829 ||  || — || September 5, 2008 || Kitt Peak || Spacewatch || — || align=right data-sort-value="0.68" | 680 m || 
|-id=830 bgcolor=#fefefe
| 394830 ||  || — || September 3, 2008 || Kitt Peak || Spacewatch || — || align=right data-sort-value="0.93" | 930 m || 
|-id=831 bgcolor=#fefefe
| 394831 ||  || — || September 23, 2008 || Socorro || LINEAR || — || align=right data-sort-value="0.98" | 980 m || 
|-id=832 bgcolor=#fefefe
| 394832 ||  || — || September 24, 2008 || Socorro || LINEAR || — || align=right data-sort-value="0.88" | 880 m || 
|-id=833 bgcolor=#fefefe
| 394833 ||  || — || September 24, 2008 || Socorro || LINEAR || — || align=right data-sort-value="0.94" | 940 m || 
|-id=834 bgcolor=#fefefe
| 394834 ||  || — || September 28, 2008 || Socorro || LINEAR || — || align=right data-sort-value="0.81" | 810 m || 
|-id=835 bgcolor=#fefefe
| 394835 ||  || — || September 28, 2008 || Socorro || LINEAR || — || align=right data-sort-value="0.98" | 980 m || 
|-id=836 bgcolor=#fefefe
| 394836 ||  || — || September 28, 2008 || Socorro || LINEAR || — || align=right | 1.0 km || 
|-id=837 bgcolor=#FA8072
| 394837 ||  || — || September 24, 2008 || Mount Lemmon || Mount Lemmon Survey || — || align=right data-sort-value="0.82" | 820 m || 
|-id=838 bgcolor=#fefefe
| 394838 ||  || — || September 25, 2008 || Kitt Peak || Spacewatch || — || align=right data-sort-value="0.57" | 570 m || 
|-id=839 bgcolor=#fefefe
| 394839 ||  || — || September 29, 2008 || Mount Lemmon || Mount Lemmon Survey || — || align=right data-sort-value="0.98" | 980 m || 
|-id=840 bgcolor=#fefefe
| 394840 ||  || — || September 22, 2008 || Mount Lemmon || Mount Lemmon Survey || — || align=right data-sort-value="0.82" | 820 m || 
|-id=841 bgcolor=#fefefe
| 394841 ||  || — || September 28, 2008 || Mount Lemmon || Mount Lemmon Survey || — || align=right data-sort-value="0.57" | 570 m || 
|-id=842 bgcolor=#fefefe
| 394842 ||  || — || September 29, 2008 || Kitt Peak || Spacewatch || — || align=right data-sort-value="0.72" | 720 m || 
|-id=843 bgcolor=#fefefe
| 394843 ||  || — || September 21, 2008 || Catalina || CSS || — || align=right data-sort-value="0.84" | 840 m || 
|-id=844 bgcolor=#fefefe
| 394844 ||  || — || September 22, 2008 || Kitt Peak || Spacewatch || V || align=right data-sort-value="0.78" | 780 m || 
|-id=845 bgcolor=#fefefe
| 394845 ||  || — || September 24, 2008 || Kitt Peak || Spacewatch || V || align=right data-sort-value="0.61" | 610 m || 
|-id=846 bgcolor=#fefefe
| 394846 ||  || — || September 25, 2008 || Kitt Peak || Spacewatch || — || align=right data-sort-value="0.94" | 940 m || 
|-id=847 bgcolor=#fefefe
| 394847 ||  || — || September 29, 2008 || Mount Lemmon || Mount Lemmon Survey || V || align=right data-sort-value="0.69" | 690 m || 
|-id=848 bgcolor=#fefefe
| 394848 ||  || — || September 22, 2008 || Mount Lemmon || Mount Lemmon Survey || — || align=right data-sort-value="0.93" | 930 m || 
|-id=849 bgcolor=#fefefe
| 394849 ||  || — || September 25, 2008 || Kitt Peak || Spacewatch || — || align=right data-sort-value="0.94" | 940 m || 
|-id=850 bgcolor=#fefefe
| 394850 ||  || — || September 23, 2008 || Catalina || CSS || — || align=right | 1.2 km || 
|-id=851 bgcolor=#E9E9E9
| 394851 ||  || — || September 27, 2008 || Mount Lemmon || Mount Lemmon Survey || (5) || align=right data-sort-value="0.83" | 830 m || 
|-id=852 bgcolor=#fefefe
| 394852 ||  || — || October 1, 2008 || Kitt Peak || Spacewatch || V || align=right data-sort-value="0.80" | 800 m || 
|-id=853 bgcolor=#fefefe
| 394853 ||  || — || October 1, 2008 || Mount Lemmon || Mount Lemmon Survey || — || align=right data-sort-value="0.78" | 780 m || 
|-id=854 bgcolor=#E9E9E9
| 394854 ||  || — || October 1, 2008 || Mount Lemmon || Mount Lemmon Survey || critical || align=right data-sort-value="0.65" | 650 m || 
|-id=855 bgcolor=#fefefe
| 394855 ||  || — || November 12, 2005 || Kitt Peak || Spacewatch || — || align=right data-sort-value="0.78" | 780 m || 
|-id=856 bgcolor=#fefefe
| 394856 ||  || — || September 20, 2008 || Kitt Peak || Spacewatch || — || align=right data-sort-value="0.62" | 620 m || 
|-id=857 bgcolor=#fefefe
| 394857 ||  || — || October 2, 2008 || Kitt Peak || Spacewatch || MAS || align=right data-sort-value="0.90" | 900 m || 
|-id=858 bgcolor=#fefefe
| 394858 ||  || — || September 23, 2008 || Kitt Peak || Spacewatch || — || align=right | 1.0 km || 
|-id=859 bgcolor=#fefefe
| 394859 ||  || — || October 2, 2008 || Kitt Peak || Spacewatch || — || align=right data-sort-value="0.75" | 750 m || 
|-id=860 bgcolor=#fefefe
| 394860 ||  || — || October 3, 2008 || Mount Lemmon || Mount Lemmon Survey || — || align=right data-sort-value="0.60" | 600 m || 
|-id=861 bgcolor=#fefefe
| 394861 ||  || — || October 6, 2008 || Catalina || CSS || — || align=right | 1.1 km || 
|-id=862 bgcolor=#fefefe
| 394862 ||  || — || October 6, 2008 || Catalina || CSS || — || align=right data-sort-value="0.90" | 900 m || 
|-id=863 bgcolor=#E9E9E9
| 394863 ||  || — || October 6, 2008 || Catalina || CSS || — || align=right | 1.6 km || 
|-id=864 bgcolor=#fefefe
| 394864 ||  || — || October 6, 2008 || Kitt Peak || Spacewatch || — || align=right data-sort-value="0.94" | 940 m || 
|-id=865 bgcolor=#fefefe
| 394865 ||  || — || October 8, 2008 || Mount Lemmon || Mount Lemmon Survey || — || align=right | 1.1 km || 
|-id=866 bgcolor=#fefefe
| 394866 ||  || — || October 8, 2008 || Kitt Peak || Spacewatch || NYS || align=right data-sort-value="0.77" | 770 m || 
|-id=867 bgcolor=#fefefe
| 394867 ||  || — || September 23, 2008 || Mount Lemmon || Mount Lemmon Survey || — || align=right data-sort-value="0.70" | 700 m || 
|-id=868 bgcolor=#fefefe
| 394868 ||  || — || October 10, 2008 || Mount Lemmon || Mount Lemmon Survey || — || align=right | 1.1 km || 
|-id=869 bgcolor=#C2FFFF
| 394869 ||  || — || October 1, 2008 || Mount Lemmon || Mount Lemmon Survey || L4 || align=right | 7.8 km || 
|-id=870 bgcolor=#fefefe
| 394870 ||  || — || April 13, 2004 || Kitt Peak || Spacewatch || — || align=right data-sort-value="0.85" | 850 m || 
|-id=871 bgcolor=#E9E9E9
| 394871 ||  || — || October 8, 2008 || Mount Lemmon || Mount Lemmon Survey || — || align=right | 1.3 km || 
|-id=872 bgcolor=#fefefe
| 394872 ||  || — || October 6, 2008 || Mount Lemmon || Mount Lemmon Survey || — || align=right data-sort-value="0.94" | 940 m || 
|-id=873 bgcolor=#fefefe
| 394873 ||  || — || October 10, 2008 || Mount Lemmon || Mount Lemmon Survey || — || align=right data-sort-value="0.80" | 800 m || 
|-id=874 bgcolor=#E9E9E9
| 394874 ||  || — || September 23, 2008 || Mount Lemmon || Mount Lemmon Survey || — || align=right | 1.4 km || 
|-id=875 bgcolor=#E9E9E9
| 394875 ||  || — || October 10, 2004 || Kitt Peak || Spacewatch || (5) || align=right data-sort-value="0.84" | 840 m || 
|-id=876 bgcolor=#fefefe
| 394876 ||  || — || October 19, 2008 || Kitt Peak || Spacewatch || — || align=right data-sort-value="0.83" | 830 m || 
|-id=877 bgcolor=#fefefe
| 394877 ||  || — || October 20, 2008 || Kitt Peak || Spacewatch || V || align=right data-sort-value="0.75" | 750 m || 
|-id=878 bgcolor=#fefefe
| 394878 ||  || — || October 21, 2008 || Kitt Peak || Spacewatch || V || align=right data-sort-value="0.71" | 710 m || 
|-id=879 bgcolor=#fefefe
| 394879 ||  || — || October 21, 2008 || Kitt Peak || Spacewatch || (2076) || align=right | 1.0 km || 
|-id=880 bgcolor=#fefefe
| 394880 ||  || — || October 21, 2008 || Kitt Peak || Spacewatch || — || align=right data-sort-value="0.80" | 800 m || 
|-id=881 bgcolor=#fefefe
| 394881 ||  || — || October 7, 2008 || Catalina || CSS || — || align=right | 1.3 km || 
|-id=882 bgcolor=#E9E9E9
| 394882 ||  || — || October 22, 2008 || Kitt Peak || Spacewatch || — || align=right | 1.2 km || 
|-id=883 bgcolor=#E9E9E9
| 394883 ||  || — || October 2, 2008 || Mount Lemmon || Mount Lemmon Survey || — || align=right | 1.3 km || 
|-id=884 bgcolor=#fefefe
| 394884 ||  || — || April 16, 2007 || Mount Lemmon || Mount Lemmon Survey || — || align=right data-sort-value="0.65" | 650 m || 
|-id=885 bgcolor=#fefefe
| 394885 ||  || — || October 23, 2008 || Kitt Peak || Spacewatch || — || align=right | 1.2 km || 
|-id=886 bgcolor=#fefefe
| 394886 ||  || — || October 23, 2008 || Kitt Peak || Spacewatch || NYS || align=right data-sort-value="0.65" | 650 m || 
|-id=887 bgcolor=#fefefe
| 394887 ||  || — || October 23, 2008 || Kitt Peak || Spacewatch || — || align=right | 1.0 km || 
|-id=888 bgcolor=#fefefe
| 394888 ||  || — || October 24, 2008 || Mount Lemmon || Mount Lemmon Survey || — || align=right data-sort-value="0.82" | 820 m || 
|-id=889 bgcolor=#fefefe
| 394889 ||  || — || October 24, 2008 || Mount Lemmon || Mount Lemmon Survey || — || align=right data-sort-value="0.96" | 960 m || 
|-id=890 bgcolor=#fefefe
| 394890 ||  || — || October 24, 2008 || Kitt Peak || Spacewatch || — || align=right | 1.0 km || 
|-id=891 bgcolor=#fefefe
| 394891 ||  || — || October 24, 2008 || Kitt Peak || Spacewatch || NYScritical || align=right data-sort-value="0.58" | 580 m || 
|-id=892 bgcolor=#fefefe
| 394892 ||  || — || October 25, 2008 || Catalina || CSS || V || align=right data-sort-value="0.78" | 780 m || 
|-id=893 bgcolor=#E9E9E9
| 394893 ||  || — || October 9, 2008 || Mount Lemmon || Mount Lemmon Survey || — || align=right | 1.3 km || 
|-id=894 bgcolor=#fefefe
| 394894 ||  || — || October 25, 2008 || Kitt Peak || Spacewatch || — || align=right data-sort-value="0.82" | 820 m || 
|-id=895 bgcolor=#fefefe
| 394895 ||  || — || October 25, 2008 || Kitt Peak || Spacewatch || — || align=right data-sort-value="0.95" | 950 m || 
|-id=896 bgcolor=#fefefe
| 394896 ||  || — || October 26, 2008 || Kitt Peak || Spacewatch || — || align=right | 1.2 km || 
|-id=897 bgcolor=#fefefe
| 394897 ||  || — || September 4, 2008 || Kitt Peak || Spacewatch || — || align=right data-sort-value="0.79" | 790 m || 
|-id=898 bgcolor=#E9E9E9
| 394898 ||  || — || October 20, 2008 || Kitt Peak || Spacewatch || (5) || align=right data-sort-value="0.90" | 900 m || 
|-id=899 bgcolor=#E9E9E9
| 394899 ||  || — || October 29, 2008 || Kitt Peak || Spacewatch || — || align=right | 1.6 km || 
|-id=900 bgcolor=#fefefe
| 394900 ||  || — || October 29, 2008 || Kitt Peak || Spacewatch || — || align=right data-sort-value="0.94" | 940 m || 
|}

394901–395000 

|-bgcolor=#fefefe
| 394901 ||  || — || October 30, 2008 || Kitt Peak || Spacewatch || — || align=right data-sort-value="0.89" | 890 m || 
|-id=902 bgcolor=#fefefe
| 394902 ||  || — || October 22, 2008 || Kitt Peak || Spacewatch || — || align=right | 1.0 km || 
|-id=903 bgcolor=#E9E9E9
| 394903 ||  || — || October 31, 2008 || Mount Lemmon || Mount Lemmon Survey || — || align=right | 1.5 km || 
|-id=904 bgcolor=#fefefe
| 394904 ||  || — || October 28, 2008 || Kitt Peak || Spacewatch || V || align=right data-sort-value="0.66" | 660 m || 
|-id=905 bgcolor=#fefefe
| 394905 ||  || — || March 13, 2007 || Mount Lemmon || Mount Lemmon Survey || — || align=right data-sort-value="0.88" | 880 m || 
|-id=906 bgcolor=#fefefe
| 394906 ||  || — || October 26, 2008 || Mount Lemmon || Mount Lemmon Survey || — || align=right | 1.0 km || 
|-id=907 bgcolor=#fefefe
| 394907 ||  || — || September 25, 2008 || Mount Lemmon || Mount Lemmon Survey || V || align=right data-sort-value="0.78" | 780 m || 
|-id=908 bgcolor=#fefefe
| 394908 ||  || — || November 1, 2008 || Kitt Peak || Spacewatch || — || align=right | 1.1 km || 
|-id=909 bgcolor=#fefefe
| 394909 ||  || — || November 2, 2008 || Kitt Peak || Spacewatch || SUL || align=right | 2.6 km || 
|-id=910 bgcolor=#fefefe
| 394910 ||  || — || November 3, 2008 || Mount Lemmon || Mount Lemmon Survey || — || align=right | 1.3 km || 
|-id=911 bgcolor=#fefefe
| 394911 ||  || — || August 25, 2004 || Kitt Peak || Spacewatch || — || align=right data-sort-value="0.65" | 650 m || 
|-id=912 bgcolor=#fefefe
| 394912 ||  || — || November 7, 2008 || Catalina || CSS || V || align=right data-sort-value="0.74" | 740 m || 
|-id=913 bgcolor=#E9E9E9
| 394913 ||  || — || November 2, 2008 || Mount Lemmon || Mount Lemmon Survey || — || align=right | 1.6 km || 
|-id=914 bgcolor=#E9E9E9
| 394914 ||  || — || November 7, 2008 || Mount Lemmon || Mount Lemmon Survey || — || align=right | 1.2 km || 
|-id=915 bgcolor=#fefefe
| 394915 ||  || — || November 6, 2008 || Kitt Peak || Spacewatch || — || align=right data-sort-value="0.87" | 870 m || 
|-id=916 bgcolor=#E9E9E9
| 394916 ||  || — || November 1, 2008 || Mount Lemmon || Mount Lemmon Survey || (5) || align=right | 1.1 km || 
|-id=917 bgcolor=#E9E9E9
| 394917 ||  || — || November 7, 2008 || Mount Lemmon || Mount Lemmon Survey || — || align=right | 1.8 km || 
|-id=918 bgcolor=#fefefe
| 394918 ||  || — || November 18, 2008 || Catalina || CSS || — || align=right data-sort-value="0.83" | 830 m || 
|-id=919 bgcolor=#fefefe
| 394919 ||  || — || October 23, 2008 || Kitt Peak || Spacewatch || — || align=right data-sort-value="0.90" | 900 m || 
|-id=920 bgcolor=#E9E9E9
| 394920 ||  || — || October 26, 2008 || Kitt Peak || Spacewatch || JUN || align=right data-sort-value="0.95" | 950 m || 
|-id=921 bgcolor=#fefefe
| 394921 ||  || — || November 17, 2008 || Kitt Peak || Spacewatch || — || align=right | 1.0 km || 
|-id=922 bgcolor=#fefefe
| 394922 ||  || — || November 18, 2008 || Kitt Peak || Spacewatch || V || align=right data-sort-value="0.74" | 740 m || 
|-id=923 bgcolor=#E9E9E9
| 394923 ||  || — || October 27, 2008 || Kitt Peak || Spacewatch || — || align=right | 1.7 km || 
|-id=924 bgcolor=#fefefe
| 394924 ||  || — || September 29, 2008 || Mount Lemmon || Mount Lemmon Survey || — || align=right | 1.2 km || 
|-id=925 bgcolor=#E9E9E9
| 394925 ||  || — || September 29, 2008 || Mount Lemmon || Mount Lemmon Survey || — || align=right | 1.2 km || 
|-id=926 bgcolor=#E9E9E9
| 394926 ||  || — || November 20, 2008 || Kitt Peak || Spacewatch || — || align=right | 1.2 km || 
|-id=927 bgcolor=#E9E9E9
| 394927 ||  || — || November 20, 2008 || Kitt Peak || Spacewatch || (5) || align=right data-sort-value="0.80" | 800 m || 
|-id=928 bgcolor=#E9E9E9
| 394928 ||  || — || November 23, 2008 || Mount Lemmon || Mount Lemmon Survey || — || align=right | 3.0 km || 
|-id=929 bgcolor=#E9E9E9
| 394929 ||  || — || November 25, 2008 || Dauban || F. Kugel || — || align=right | 1.7 km || 
|-id=930 bgcolor=#fefefe
| 394930 ||  || — || November 26, 2008 || Farra d'Isonzo || Farra d'Isonzo || — || align=right data-sort-value="0.68" | 680 m || 
|-id=931 bgcolor=#E9E9E9
| 394931 ||  || — || November 30, 2008 || Socorro || LINEAR || — || align=right | 1.2 km || 
|-id=932 bgcolor=#E9E9E9
| 394932 ||  || — || October 21, 2008 || Mount Lemmon || Mount Lemmon Survey || — || align=right data-sort-value="0.86" | 860 m || 
|-id=933 bgcolor=#fefefe
| 394933 ||  || — || October 26, 2008 || Kitt Peak || Spacewatch || — || align=right data-sort-value="0.78" | 780 m || 
|-id=934 bgcolor=#E9E9E9
| 394934 ||  || — || November 24, 2008 || Kitt Peak || Spacewatch || — || align=right | 1.1 km || 
|-id=935 bgcolor=#FA8072
| 394935 ||  || — || January 9, 2006 || Kitt Peak || Spacewatch || — || align=right | 1.1 km || 
|-id=936 bgcolor=#E9E9E9
| 394936 ||  || — || November 21, 2008 || Catalina || CSS || — || align=right | 3.2 km || 
|-id=937 bgcolor=#E9E9E9
| 394937 ||  || — || November 22, 2008 || Kitt Peak || Spacewatch || — || align=right | 1.7 km || 
|-id=938 bgcolor=#FA8072
| 394938 ||  || — || December 4, 2008 || Socorro || LINEAR || — || align=right | 2.7 km || 
|-id=939 bgcolor=#fefefe
| 394939 ||  || — || December 2, 2008 || Kitt Peak || Spacewatch || — || align=right data-sort-value="0.76" | 760 m || 
|-id=940 bgcolor=#E9E9E9
| 394940 ||  || — || December 2, 2008 || Kitt Peak || Spacewatch || — || align=right data-sort-value="0.85" | 850 m || 
|-id=941 bgcolor=#E9E9E9
| 394941 ||  || — || December 2, 2008 || Kitt Peak || Spacewatch || — || align=right data-sort-value="0.98" | 980 m || 
|-id=942 bgcolor=#E9E9E9
| 394942 ||  || — || December 5, 2008 || Mount Lemmon || Mount Lemmon Survey || — || align=right | 1.9 km || 
|-id=943 bgcolor=#fefefe
| 394943 ||  || — || December 1, 2008 || Socorro || LINEAR || — || align=right | 1.2 km || 
|-id=944 bgcolor=#E9E9E9
| 394944 ||  || — || November 6, 2008 || Mount Lemmon || Mount Lemmon Survey || — || align=right data-sort-value="0.80" | 800 m || 
|-id=945 bgcolor=#fefefe
| 394945 ||  || — || October 23, 2008 || Kitt Peak || Spacewatch || — || align=right data-sort-value="0.74" | 740 m || 
|-id=946 bgcolor=#E9E9E9
| 394946 ||  || — || December 21, 2008 || Catalina || CSS || — || align=right | 1.9 km || 
|-id=947 bgcolor=#E9E9E9
| 394947 ||  || — || December 31, 2008 || Mayhill || A. Lowe || — || align=right | 1.1 km || 
|-id=948 bgcolor=#E9E9E9
| 394948 ||  || — || December 21, 2008 || Mount Lemmon || Mount Lemmon Survey || JUN || align=right | 1.1 km || 
|-id=949 bgcolor=#E9E9E9
| 394949 ||  || — || December 29, 2008 || Mount Lemmon || Mount Lemmon Survey || EUN || align=right | 1.5 km || 
|-id=950 bgcolor=#E9E9E9
| 394950 ||  || — || December 30, 2008 || Kitt Peak || Spacewatch || — || align=right | 1.1 km || 
|-id=951 bgcolor=#E9E9E9
| 394951 ||  || — || December 30, 2008 || Kitt Peak || Spacewatch || EUN || align=right | 1.5 km || 
|-id=952 bgcolor=#E9E9E9
| 394952 ||  || — || December 30, 2008 || Kitt Peak || Spacewatch || — || align=right data-sort-value="0.91" | 910 m || 
|-id=953 bgcolor=#E9E9E9
| 394953 ||  || — || December 30, 2008 || Mount Lemmon || Mount Lemmon Survey || — || align=right | 1.8 km || 
|-id=954 bgcolor=#E9E9E9
| 394954 ||  || — || December 30, 2008 || Mount Lemmon || Mount Lemmon Survey || — || align=right data-sort-value="0.91" | 910 m || 
|-id=955 bgcolor=#E9E9E9
| 394955 ||  || — || September 30, 2003 || Kitt Peak || Spacewatch || EUN || align=right | 1.5 km || 
|-id=956 bgcolor=#E9E9E9
| 394956 ||  || — || December 30, 2008 || Mount Lemmon || Mount Lemmon Survey || — || align=right | 1.9 km || 
|-id=957 bgcolor=#E9E9E9
| 394957 ||  || — || December 29, 2008 || Mount Lemmon || Mount Lemmon Survey || — || align=right | 1.2 km || 
|-id=958 bgcolor=#E9E9E9
| 394958 ||  || — || December 29, 2008 || Kitt Peak || Spacewatch || — || align=right data-sort-value="0.89" | 890 m || 
|-id=959 bgcolor=#E9E9E9
| 394959 ||  || — || December 29, 2008 || Kitt Peak || Spacewatch || MAR || align=right data-sort-value="0.97" | 970 m || 
|-id=960 bgcolor=#E9E9E9
| 394960 ||  || — || December 30, 2008 || Kitt Peak || Spacewatch || — || align=right | 1.0 km || 
|-id=961 bgcolor=#E9E9E9
| 394961 ||  || — || December 4, 2008 || Mount Lemmon || Mount Lemmon Survey || — || align=right | 1.3 km || 
|-id=962 bgcolor=#E9E9E9
| 394962 ||  || — || November 20, 2008 || Mount Lemmon || Mount Lemmon Survey || — || align=right | 1.4 km || 
|-id=963 bgcolor=#fefefe
| 394963 ||  || — || December 22, 2008 || Kitt Peak || Spacewatch || — || align=right data-sort-value="0.89" | 890 m || 
|-id=964 bgcolor=#E9E9E9
| 394964 ||  || — || December 30, 2008 || Kitt Peak || Spacewatch || — || align=right data-sort-value="0.90" | 900 m || 
|-id=965 bgcolor=#E9E9E9
| 394965 ||  || — || December 30, 2008 || Kitt Peak || Spacewatch || — || align=right | 1.3 km || 
|-id=966 bgcolor=#E9E9E9
| 394966 ||  || — || December 30, 2008 || Mount Lemmon || Mount Lemmon Survey || — || align=right | 1.3 km || 
|-id=967 bgcolor=#fefefe
| 394967 ||  || — || December 22, 2008 || Mount Lemmon || Mount Lemmon Survey || NYS || align=right data-sort-value="0.96" | 960 m || 
|-id=968 bgcolor=#E9E9E9
| 394968 ||  || — || December 22, 2008 || Catalina || CSS || — || align=right | 1.9 km || 
|-id=969 bgcolor=#d6d6d6
| 394969 ||  || — || December 30, 2008 || Kitt Peak || Spacewatch || KOR || align=right | 1.1 km || 
|-id=970 bgcolor=#E9E9E9
| 394970 ||  || — || December 21, 2008 || Socorro || LINEAR || (5) || align=right data-sort-value="0.82" | 820 m || 
|-id=971 bgcolor=#fefefe
| 394971 ||  || — || December 22, 2008 || Kitt Peak || Spacewatch || — || align=right data-sort-value="0.69" | 690 m || 
|-id=972 bgcolor=#E9E9E9
| 394972 ||  || — || December 30, 2008 || Mount Lemmon || Mount Lemmon Survey || — || align=right | 2.1 km || 
|-id=973 bgcolor=#E9E9E9
| 394973 ||  || — || December 22, 2008 || Mount Lemmon || Mount Lemmon Survey || — || align=right | 1.1 km || 
|-id=974 bgcolor=#fefefe
| 394974 ||  || — || December 3, 2008 || Mount Lemmon || Mount Lemmon Survey || — || align=right data-sort-value="0.93" | 930 m || 
|-id=975 bgcolor=#E9E9E9
| 394975 ||  || — || December 21, 2008 || Kitt Peak || Spacewatch || HNS || align=right | 1.5 km || 
|-id=976 bgcolor=#E9E9E9
| 394976 ||  || — || January 15, 2009 || Calar Alto || F. Hormuth || ADE || align=right | 1.9 km || 
|-id=977 bgcolor=#E9E9E9
| 394977 ||  || — || December 21, 2008 || Mount Lemmon || Mount Lemmon Survey || — || align=right data-sort-value="0.99" | 990 m || 
|-id=978 bgcolor=#fefefe
| 394978 ||  || — || January 3, 2009 || Kitt Peak || Spacewatch || — || align=right data-sort-value="0.82" | 820 m || 
|-id=979 bgcolor=#E9E9E9
| 394979 ||  || — || December 29, 2008 || Kitt Peak || Spacewatch || — || align=right | 1.3 km || 
|-id=980 bgcolor=#E9E9E9
| 394980 ||  || — || November 8, 2008 || Mount Lemmon || Mount Lemmon Survey || — || align=right | 1.2 km || 
|-id=981 bgcolor=#E9E9E9
| 394981 ||  || — || January 18, 2009 || Socorro || LINEAR || — || align=right | 1.9 km || 
|-id=982 bgcolor=#E9E9E9
| 394982 ||  || — || January 16, 2009 || Mount Lemmon || Mount Lemmon Survey || — || align=right | 2.7 km || 
|-id=983 bgcolor=#E9E9E9
| 394983 ||  || — || January 17, 2009 || Kitt Peak || Spacewatch || — || align=right | 1.9 km || 
|-id=984 bgcolor=#d6d6d6
| 394984 ||  || — || December 29, 2008 || Mount Lemmon || Mount Lemmon Survey || — || align=right | 2.2 km || 
|-id=985 bgcolor=#E9E9E9
| 394985 ||  || — || January 16, 2009 || Mount Lemmon || Mount Lemmon Survey || — || align=right data-sort-value="0.88" | 880 m || 
|-id=986 bgcolor=#E9E9E9
| 394986 ||  || — || January 18, 2009 || Kitt Peak || Spacewatch || EUN || align=right | 1.1 km || 
|-id=987 bgcolor=#E9E9E9
| 394987 ||  || — || January 16, 2009 || Kitt Peak || Spacewatch || — || align=right | 1.5 km || 
|-id=988 bgcolor=#E9E9E9
| 394988 ||  || — || January 16, 2009 || Kitt Peak || Spacewatch || — || align=right | 1.2 km || 
|-id=989 bgcolor=#E9E9E9
| 394989 ||  || — || January 16, 2009 || Kitt Peak || Spacewatch || — || align=right | 1.3 km || 
|-id=990 bgcolor=#E9E9E9
| 394990 ||  || — || January 16, 2009 || Kitt Peak || Spacewatch || (5) || align=right data-sort-value="0.74" | 740 m || 
|-id=991 bgcolor=#E9E9E9
| 394991 ||  || — || January 16, 2009 || Mount Lemmon || Mount Lemmon Survey || — || align=right | 1.3 km || 
|-id=992 bgcolor=#E9E9E9
| 394992 ||  || — || February 1, 2005 || Kitt Peak || Spacewatch || — || align=right | 1.5 km || 
|-id=993 bgcolor=#fefefe
| 394993 ||  || — || January 16, 2009 || Mount Lemmon || Mount Lemmon Survey || MAS || align=right data-sort-value="0.99" | 990 m || 
|-id=994 bgcolor=#fefefe
| 394994 ||  || — || December 29, 2008 || Kitt Peak || Spacewatch || — || align=right data-sort-value="0.89" | 890 m || 
|-id=995 bgcolor=#E9E9E9
| 394995 ||  || — || January 20, 2009 || Kitt Peak || Spacewatch || — || align=right | 1.5 km || 
|-id=996 bgcolor=#E9E9E9
| 394996 ||  || — || January 20, 2009 || Kitt Peak || Spacewatch || — || align=right | 2.1 km || 
|-id=997 bgcolor=#E9E9E9
| 394997 ||  || — || January 26, 2009 || Purple Mountain || PMO NEO || — || align=right | 3.1 km || 
|-id=998 bgcolor=#E9E9E9
| 394998 ||  || — || January 25, 2009 || Socorro || LINEAR || — || align=right | 1.8 km || 
|-id=999 bgcolor=#E9E9E9
| 394999 ||  || — || January 25, 2009 || Kitt Peak || Spacewatch || — || align=right | 2.2 km || 
|-id=000 bgcolor=#E9E9E9
| 395000 ||  || — || January 26, 2009 || Mount Lemmon || Mount Lemmon Survey || — || align=right | 1.5 km || 
|}

References

External links 
 Discovery Circumstances: Numbered Minor Planets (390001)–(395000) (IAU Minor Planet Center)

0394